The 2014 Hamilton municipal election was a municipal election that occurred on October 27, 2014, to select one mayor, fifteen members of the Hamilton City Council and members of both English and French Public and Catholic School Boards. As per the Ontario Municipal Elections Act, nominations opened on January 2, 2014, and closed on September 12, 2014. Four new councillors were elected in open seats across Hamilton while all incumbents who stood for re-election had returned to office. Though marked by a steep decline in voter turnout, this election was historic, as it saw the election of Hamiton's first openly gay and first racialized members of city council.

Issues

Ward boundary reform
Following a decision by the 2006–2010 council to put off examining electoral reform in Hamilton until after the 2010 election, the 2010–2014 council heard a staff recommendation for moving forward on redrawing ward boundaries. They moved to defer the issue to a later date, which would see the city miss the deadline of December 31, 2013 set by the Ontario Municipal Board for having district changes implemented before the municipal election in 2014.

Councillors provided a number of arguments for and against the plan to redraw ward boundaries, most notably highlighting the discrepancies between councillors in terms of the number of constituents represented, with Ward 7's councillor representing 64,000 constituents and Ward 11's councillor representing 14,000, and the $340,000 cost to taxpayers for maintaining a new council seat.

In April 2012, a number of community activists began circulating a petition that aimed to force councillors to act on the issue of ward boundaries. A provision in the Ontario Municipal Act states that residents of a municipality can actively seek to change ward boundaries by collecting 500 signatures of registered voters and submitting them to their respective city council. Municipal officials then have 90 days to act on the matter, following which, the petitioners can appeal to the Ontario Municipal Board if the decision rendered by their council is unsatisfactory. That same month, the Spectator published an editorial stating their position on the issue, calling for a public debate on the matter of ward boundaries and Hamilton's 'democratic inequality'. The petition was officially submitted to the city on April 23, 2012.

In response to the growing pressure from the community on the issue, councillors Terry Whitehead (Ward 8) and Scott Duvall (Ward 7) co-authored a piece outlining their reasoning for not supporting redrawing Hamilton's ward boundaries, noting that the costs associated with doing so would be prohibitive and that, with the area's projected growth for the coming years being considerable, it would be irresponsible for them to engage in a discussion about ward boundary revisions before the 2014 vote.

By June 2012, councillors had decided to commit $260,000 to a study that would examine boundary reform in 2015, with a proposal to come forward regarding changes for the 2018 Municipal Election.

The Hamilton-Wentworth District School Board attempted to reallocate the ward boundaries for trustees in 2013, suggesting a number of alterations that would have alleviated some of the pressures on representatives. Bound to 11 trustees divided across Hamilton's 15 wards, the necessity to combine wards caused controversy among sitting trustees. The proposals suggested would have created two large wards each represented by two trustees and merged Wards Two and Three, which drew criticism from community groups. Trustees eventually decided to task the 2014–2018 Board with examining ward boundary reform after city council redraws boundaries.

Proposed Casino
In 2012, the Ontario Lottery and Gaming Corporation sought to consult local governments on the location of new casinos across the province. At the city's lottery and gaming subcommittee, Councillor Sam Merulla (Ward 4) called for a referendum to be held concurrent with the 2014 election to determine whether citizens were supportive of a casino being located in the downtown core. The call for a public vote was supported by leader of the Ontario New Democrats Andrea Horwath and opposed by Ancaster—Dundas—Flambrough—Westdale MPP Ted McMeekin.

A poll commissioned by the Hamilton Spectator indicated that 56% of Hamiltonians opposed a casino opening in the city, with a majority of disapproval coming from residents in the city's west end and more support coming from residents of the mountain. The OLG rejected the idea for a referendum due to time constraints, leading the city's lottery and gaming commission to opt for telephone polls and public meetings to decide on the issue.

Light Rail Transit
Since 2008, city council and Metrolinx, the transit agency responsible for projects across the Toronto and Hamilton areas, have been developing plans for a new rapid transit system in Hamilton to ease congestion on the city's Hamilton Street Railway (HSR) system. Early discussions resulted in a rapid transit feasibility study that pointed toward light rail transit (LRT) as the preferred system. In September, 2008, a city-commissioned survey found that 94% of Hamiltonians surveyed supported investment in rapid transit with 66% supporting LRT, 8% favouring bus rapid transit (BRT), and 20% endorsing either option.

Plans for an LRT system moved ahead in 2008 when Hamilton City Council endorsed what became known as the BLAST Network, an acronym for the 5 lines that would comprise Hamilton's rapid transit system. Despite original hopes that the provincial government would cover the entire cost of the project, research began to show that the city would be responsible for approximately 15% of the costs. Consultations began across the city and included McMaster students and community groups to poll locations for stations and train frequency.

Community groups quickly established positions on the issue. Both the Downtown Hamilton Business Improvement Area and the International Village BIA stated their support for the project, though they expressed concerns about the possibility of closing part of King Street East to automobile traffic. Gord Thompson, a local pawn shop owner was quoted as saying, "When you talk about closing down the street from Wellington, that's the entrance to the business area and that scares the hell out of us." At the same time, a poll of McMaster students found the campus to be extremely supportive of the project, with 85% of students who did not use transit regularly indicating they would begin using the HSR more frequently if an LRT line was available.

In August 2010, BRT advocates began pushing of the city to reconsider their commitment to LRT, citing lower costs and case studies from other municipalities. These claims were challenged by urban planners, economists, and some local business owners who believed the long-term economic benefits of LRT far outweighed the initial costs and infrastructure expenditures.

During the 2010 election campaign, then-candidate Bratina announced his support for the city to push for construction of the A-Line route from LIUNA Station on James Street North to the John C. Munro Hamilton International Airport in Mount Hope. Then-mayor Eisenberger and former mayor DiIanni endorsed the existing plan.

After the election, the city updated their BLAST plan to reflect the concerns made by the community, which brought more business leaders on-side with the plan. In 2011, though, all non-essential work on LRT was halted, prompting Ward 2 councillor Jason Farr to submit a motion requesting council reaffirm its support for LRT. In September, Bratina told CHML host Bill Kelly that LRT was not a priority, though the city was not abandoning plans to implement rapid transit. During the 2011 provincial election, then-Premier Dalton McGuinty told the Hamilton Spectator that he and Bratina had been corresponding about the mayor's preference for increased funding for GO Transit service into the city.

Despite this, in 2012, Metrolinx announced that Hamilton's LRT plan was one of the agency's top priorities. In 2013, debate over LRT became heated when Councillor Farr accused Bratina of intimidating city staff. The accusation was followed by the councillor shouting at the mayor, which led to Ward Four Councillor Sam Merulla to request an in-camera discussion regarding the mayor's behaviour. After the incident, council re-affirmed support for LRT and requested that the province support 100% funding for the project.

Mayoral Election

Campaign
Ward One councillor Brian McHattie was the first candidate to officially announce his interest in running for mayor, telling the Spectator Andrew Dreschel in August 2013 that he was forming an exploratory committee and would know whether a campaign was possible in October 2013. On September 30, 2013, McHattie announced he would be running for mayor on the Laircast, a local podcast. He was the first candidate to file for election on January 2, 2014, saying "It's time for a different kind of Hamilton."

Despite initially announcing his intention to run for Ward 3 councillor, Michael Baldasaro posted a picture to the social networking site Facebook indicating he will be seeking the office of mayor. He filed to run for Mayor on January 2, 2014.

On March 13, Hamilton Spectator columnist Andrew Dreschel reported that senior Liberal Party insiders confirmed Bob Bratina would not seek another term as mayor, opting to contest the party's federal nomination in Hamilton Centre. The following day, Bratina officially announced that he would not seek re-election on AM 900 CHML.

The following Monday, March 17, Ward Nine councillor Brad Clark filed to run for the mayoralty. Discussing his decision to run with local media, Clark said he would focus his campaign on creating jobs, attracting new businesses, and ensuring no municipal tax dollars are spent on light rail transit.

After months of stating he was interested in another bid for the city's mayoralty, former mayor Fred Eisenberger told the media on March 27 that he would file nomination papers the following day. Flanked by supporters and family, he registered on March 28, telling reporters "We have a need to fix our commercial and industrial tax base...The tax base is declining and continues to. We need to turn that around."

On March 31, embattled Ontario Taxi Workers Union present Ejaz Butt registered to run for mayor, months after a year-long battle over the direction of his union ended with his reinstatement at its head. The same day, 2003 mayoral candidate and 2010 Ward Two council race runner-up Matt Jelly announced he would be running for mayor again. Spectator reporter Dan Nolan later wrote on Twitter that Jelly's announcement was revealed to be an elaborate April Fools' Day prank.

On Thursday, April 3, American late night television host Jimmy Kimmel discussed the Hamilton mayoral race, particularly Butt's recently announced candidacy. Poking fun at Butt's name, Kimmel asked his audience: "Will someone please steal me one of his lawn signs?". Butt later said that the joke was very funny. "It makes me laugh", Butt told the Spectator, "I am not offended. I love my Butt – it will always be behind me.

On April 14, former Ward 8 councillor Don Ross announced he would be dropping out of the mayoral race. In his statement to the press, Ross indicated that he did not want to draw support away from any candidate who could change the direction of council.

On July 2, McHattie announced that he would be visiting all of the city's nearly 200 neighbourhoods in 100 days, commenting that he wanted, "to understand each neighbourhood – what's it's like to live there, what it's like to raise a family." His announcement was criticized sharply by Eisenberger's campaign manager, Chris Cutler, who tweeted "Welcome to the campaign Brian. We were wondering where you were. Campaigning for mayor means leaving your ward." This incident sparked a series of aggressive tweets on both sides and was covered in the Spectator by columnist Andrew Dreschel.

In September, local affairs website raisethehammer.org contacted candidates seeking feedback on Clark's stance against LRT. Ricky Tavares, who had registered on August 8, responded by demanding Ryan McGreal, the site's editor, purchase marijuana seeds from him and demanded proof of purchase before he would interact with the media.

Following Tavares' unconventional request and the decision on the part of a business coalition to invite only McHattie, Eisenberger, and Clark to a mayoral forum on September 18, local media began discussing the seriousness of many candidates, with Spectator columnist Andrew Dreschel writing that contender Nick Iamonico had called inquiring as to why he was not being considered a frontrunner. At the forum, the three contenders debated a host of issues. Eisenberger and McHattie both expressing their support for LRT while Clark favoured a referendum on LRT and a bus rapid transit plan. All candidates indicated their support for redrawing ward boundaries for the 2018 Municipal Election and attempted to highlight their opponent's controversial positions and values, including McHattie's opposition to a proposed suburban business park around the Hamilton International Airport, Eisenberger's past difficulties in managing council, and Clark's ties to the Ontario Progressive Conservatives and government of Mike Harris.

As the election drew closer, the campaigns between the three frontrunners became heated. In late September, the Clark campaign began attacking the record of Eisenberger while he served as mayor, claiming he misled the public on LRT and withholding information during negotiations with Metrolinx, Ontario's regional transit agency. The Eisenberger camp returned with endorsements from former mayors Larry Di Ianni and Bob Morrow, who had been serving as Ward Three councillor since the death of sitting councillor Bernie Morelli. Outgoing Mayor Bob Bratina announced he would be supporting Clark.

In their interviews with the Spectator editorial board, the top three contenders outlined their platforms and highlighted key policies and positions they would take as mayor. Clark reiterated his opposition to LRT, saying a Clark mayoralty would focus on jobs and taxes. Eisenberger expressed a need to further study LRT, but ultimately gave the system his support, while also highlighting that he chose not to take firm positions on many issues to prevent losing a "potentially good project for our city." McHattie reiterated his support for LRT as an economic catalyst and creating jobs by reaching out directly to businesses A poll released a week before the vote indicated that Eisenberger had the support of 37% of voters, with Clark and McHattie sitting at a distant 25% and 22% respectively.

Platforms

Results 

|-
!rowspan="2" colspan="2"|Candidate
!colspan="3"|Popular vote
!rowspan="2" colspan="2"|Expenditures
|-
! Votes
! %
! ±%
|-
| style="background:#66023c;"|
| style="text-align:left;" | Fred Eisenberger
| style="text-align:right;" | 49,020
| style="text-align:right;" | 39.93%
| style="text-align:right;" | +12.5%
| style="text-align:right;" | $106,647.00
|-
| style="background:#0047ab;"|
| style="text-align:left;" | Brad Clark
| style="text-align:right;" | 38,706
| style="text-align:right;" | 31.53%
| style="text-align:right;" | –
| style="text-align:right;" | $152,236.05
|-
| style="background:#008abe;"|
| style="text-align:left;" | Brian McHattie
| style="text-align:right;" | 25,020
| style="text-align:right;" | 20.38%
| style="text-align:right;" | –
| style="text-align:right;" | $129,341.11
|-
| style="background:#69359c;"|
| style="text-align:left;" | Michael Baldasaro
| style="text-align:right;" | 3,518
| style="text-align:right;" | 2.87%
| style="text-align:right;" | +0.82%
| style="text-align:right;" | $0
|-
| style="background:#8ac4fa;"|
| style="text-align:left;" | Crystal Lavigne
| style="text-align:right;" | 1,910
| style="text-align:right;" | 1.56%
| style="text-align:right;" | –
| style="text-align:right;" | $0
|-
| style="background:#dc8039;"|
| style="text-align:left;" | Ejaz Butt
| style="text-align:right;" | 1,579
| style="text-align:right;" | 1.29%
| style="text-align:right;" | –
| style="text-align:right;" | n/a1
|-
| style="background:#4287f5;"|
| style="text-align:left;" | Mike Clancy
| style="text-align:right;" | 821
| style="text-align:right;" | 0.67%
| style="text-align:right;" | –
| style="text-align:right;" | $309.19
|-
| style="background:#f44262;"|
| style="text-align:left;" | Michael A. Pattison
| style="text-align:right;" | 763
| style="text-align:right;" | 0.62%
| style="text-align:right;" | –
| style="text-align:right;" | $1,095.12
|-
| style="background:#5bab4b;"|
| style="text-align:left;" | Nick Iamonico
| style="text-align:right;" | 444
| style="text-align:right;" | 0.36%
| style="text-align:right;" | –
| style="text-align:right;" | n/a1
|-
| style="background:#ffe69e;"|
| style="text-align:left;" | Ricky Tavares
| style="text-align:right;" | 428
| style="text-align:right;" | 0.35%
| style="text-align:right;" | –
| style="text-align:right;" | $0
|-
| style="background:#ff38db;"|
| style="text-align:left;" | Warrand Francis
| style="text-align:right;" | 278
| style="text-align:right;" | 0.23%
| style="text-align:right;" | –
| style="text-align:right;" | n/a1
|-
| style="background:#7ff9b0;"|
| style="text-align:left;" | Phil Ryerson
| style="text-align:right;" | 269
| style="text-align:right;" | 0.22%
| style="text-align:right;" | –
| style="text-align:right;" | $0
|-  style="text-align:right; background:#fff;"
| colspan="2"|Total votes
|| 122,756
|| 33.53%
|| −6.92%
|| 
|-  style="text-align:right; background:#fff;"
| colspan="2"|Registered voters
|| 366,124
|| 100%
|| n/a
|| 
|-
| style="text-align:left;" colspan="6" |1 These candidates did not submit official Financial Statements and were ineligible to run in the  2018 Municipal election  Note: All Hamilton Municipal Elections are officially non-partisan.  Note: Candidate campaign colours are based on the prominent colour used in campaign items (signs, literature, etc.)and are used as a visual differentiation between candidates.
|-
| style="text-align:left;" colspan="13" |Sources: City of Hamilton, "Nominated Candidates" 
|}

Declined
Individuals listed in this section were the focus of media speculation as being possible mayoral candidates but ruled out seeking the position or did not register before the September 12 deadline.

Sophia Aggelonitis, Former Hamilton Mountain MPP
Laura Babcock, TV producer and communications professional
Marie Bountrogianni, former Liberal MPP, Hamilton Mountain and provincial cabinet minister
Teresa Cascioli, entrepreneur and former head of Lakeport Brewing
Mark Chamberlain, President of Trivaris Inc.
Chris Charlton, NDP MP, Hamilton Mountain
David Christopherson, NDP Deputy Leader and MP, Hamilton Centre
Chad Collins, Ward Five Councillor
Terry Cooke, former regional chair, Hamilton-Wentworth
Lloyd Ferguson, Ward Twelve Councillor, was named as an early contender. On August 26, 2013, Spectator columnist Andrew Dreschel wrote that Ferguson was "virtually guaranteed to be on the mayoral ballot." On Monday, April 7, Ferguson announced he would not be seeking the mayoralty, opting to run again for council in his Ancaster ward.
Andrea Horwath, leader of the Ontario New Democratic Party and MPP for Hamilton Centre.
Tom Jackson, Ward Six Councillor
Ted McMeekin, Ancaster—Dundas—Flambrough—Westdale MPP and Minister of Agriculture
Robert Pasuta, Ward Fourteen Councillor
Donna Skelly, Progressive Conservative candidate for MPP, Ancaster—Dundas—Flambrough—Westdale
Terry Whitehead, Ward Eight Councillor

City Council election

Ward One (Chedoke-Cootes)

The race for Ward One was underscored by the decision by incumbent Councillor Brian McHattie to seek the mayoralty. In October 2013, Spectator columnist Andrew Dreschel wrote about candidates considering bids, including past candidate and Locke Street Business Improvement Area member Tony Greco and Deirdre Pike, senior social planner at Hamilton's Social Planning and Research Council (SPRC).

Kirkendall neighbourhood resident Jason Allen was the first to announce his intention to seeking the vacant seat on September 4, 2013. He officially registered on January 2, 2014. Ira Rosen, vice-president of the Ainslie Wood-Westdale Community Association of Resident Homeowners, had indicated to Dreschel in late 2013 that he would be a candidate for councillor in Ward One and registered on January 7. In February, executive with the FirstOntario Credit Union, Sandy Shaw, announced her candidacy. Shaw, a former Woman of Distinction award winner, had worked closely with the SPRC in the past and was supported in her bid by Pike.

Aidan Johnson, staff lawyer with Hamilton Legal Aid announced his decision to run in Ward 1 in May, 2014. Formerly an employee of Ontario's Ministry of the Attorney General and Fulbright scholar at New York University (NYU), Johnson's bid was supported by the local Liberal Party establishment and featured endorsements from figures such as Sheila Copps and Bob Rae. The candidates were joined by Greco and former-Hamilton Bulldogs executive Brian Lewis prior to the close of nominations in September.

In late September, the Ainslie Wood/Westdale Community Association, a local group noted for its opposition to student housing around McMaster University, hosted a debate at St. Mary's Catholic High School in Ainslie Wood, during which the candidates outlined their platforms while speaking very highly of the accomplishments outgoing councillor McHattie had achieved during his time in office.

On election night, Johnson took 34.69% of the popular vote and became Hamilton's first openly gay city councillor.

|-
!rowspan="2" colspan="2"|Candidate
!colspan="3"|Popular vote
!rowspan="2" colspan="2"|Expenditures
|-
! Votes
! %
! ±%
|-
| style="background:#88c759;"|
| style="text-align:left;" | Aidan Johnson
| style="text-align:right;" |3,030
| style="text-align:right;" |34.69%
| style="text-align:right;" | –
| style="text-align:right;" |$20,215.71
|-
| style="background:#506621;"|
| style="text-align:left;" | Sandy Shaw
| style="text-align:right;" |2,390
| style="text-align:right;" |27.36%
| style="text-align:right;" | –
| style="text-align:right;" |$21,412.40
|-
| style="background:#00aeea;"|
| style="text-align:left;" | Jason Allen
| style="text-align:right;" |1,050
| style="text-align:right;" |12.02%
| style="text-align:right;" | –
| style="text-align:right;" |$9,286.10
|-
| style="background:#00f;"|
| style="text-align:left;" | Tony Greco
| style="text-align:right;" |1,024
| style="text-align:right;" |11.72%
| style="text-align:right;" |−14.7%
| style="text-align:right;" | n/a1
|-
| style="background:#7b353c;"|
| style="text-align:left;" | Brian Lewis
| style="text-align:right;" |641
| style="text-align:right;" |7.34%
| style="text-align:right;" | –
| style="text-align:right;" |$9,101.20
|-
| style="background:#0000ab;"|
| style="text-align:left;" | Ira Rosen
| style="text-align:right;" |600
| style="text-align:right;" |6.87%
| style="text-align:right;" | –
| style="text-align:right;" |$14,583.76
|- style="text-align:right;" 
| style="background:#fff;" colspan="2"|Total votes
| style="background:#fff;"|8,870
| style="background:#fff;"|40.74%
| style="background:#fff;"|+.04%
| style="text-align:right;" |
|- style="text-align:right;"  
| style="background:#fff;" colspan="2"|Registered voters
| style="background:#fff;"|21,770
| style="background:#fff;"|100%
| style="text-align:right; background:#fff;"|
| style="text-align:right;" |
|- 
| style="text-align:left;" colspan="6" |1 These candidates did not submit official Financial Statements and are, therefore, ineligible to run in the  2018 Municipal election  Note: All Hamilton Municipal Elections are officially non-partisan.  Note: Candidate campaign colours are based on the prominent colour used in campaign items (signs, literature, etc.)and are used as a visual differentiation between candidates.
|- 
| style="text-align:left;" colspan="13" |Sources: City of Hamilton, "Nominated Candidates" 
|}

Ward Two (Downtown)

The Ward Two race was the focus of early speculation when local business owner Cameron Bailey announced he would be running for the seat in 2013. Notable for causing a public uproar over his displaying of the Confederate flag, Bailey launched a campaign website and began holding meetings well before the opening of nominations in 2014. His announcement came after a public battle with city officials over the payment of a $2000 licensing fee for his restaurant, Hillbilly Heaven. Bailey had, in the past, caused some controversy over his use of the Confederate flag above his King Street East storefront and his signs declaring his store refused to serve Halal meat. Bailey's website says his campaign will be pro-business, and seek to reduce crime in the downtown core. In late 2013, Bailey's King Street restaurant shut down. Bailey failed to register for the election in 2014 and did not campaign on behalf of any other candidate during the election.

The first person to register for the race was local singer Ivana Nosic. Nosic remained in the election until April 10 when she withdrew for unknown reasons. Lynda Hykin, also an early entrant, withdrew on May 1. Hess Street resident Ed Dallas registered on April 14 and, after Nosic and Hykin withdrew, was the sole contender for the seat until June 3 when incumbent councillor Jason Farr registered to run for a second term. Dallas' campaign focused on improving the area around Pier 4, better maintaining municipal golf courses, and supporting a downtown casino.

Farr's campaign focused on continuing his work from the 2010–2014 term of office, promoting further waterfront redevelopment, and supporting the area's arts community.

On July 17, Terri Wallis, a citizen member of Hamilton's municipal Advisory Committee for Persons with Disabilities, registered to run for city council. Wallis' candidacy sparked a discussion about accessibility in Hamilton, as she would not be able to access many of Hamilton City Hall's rooms and offices without assistance due to design issues. Wallis campaigned on a platform of supporting accessibility concerns, better supporting affordable housing, and being more attentive to constituent concerns. Though initially in favour of LRT, Wallis support for the project wavered and her campaign was unsupportive of the King Street bus only lane, advocating her own transit plan, a "C-Line" express bus service along Barton Street.

Perennial candidate Kristina Heaton, local resident Ryan Henry, and 2014 Progressive Conservative candidate for Hamilton Centre, John Vail, also sought the downtown seat. Heaton's campaign focused on opposing LRT, the downtown bus lane, and traffic calming measures, which she claimed were dangerous and anti-business. Heaton also campaigned on expropriating derelict buildings and using them as training centres for marginalized populations. Vail's campaign focused on reducing densities downtown, stopping local subsidies for high-density development, and lowering taxes as a way to help bring people out of poverty.

On election night, despite a steep decline in voter turnout, Farr was reelected with nearly 2/3 of the popular vote and over 3,200 votes above his nearest challenger, Wallis. 

|-
!rowspan="2" colspan="2"|Candidate
!colspan="3"|Popular vote
!rowspan="2" colspan="2"|Expenditures
|-
! Votes
! %
! ±%
|-
| style="background:#5f9ea0;"|
| style="text-align:left;" | Jason Farr (Incumbent)
| style="text-align:right;" |4,078
| style="text-align:right;" |66.35%
| style="text-align:right;" |+45.38%
| style="text-align:right;" | $20,156.95
|-
| style="background:#ca99d8;"|
| style="text-align:left;" | Terri Wallis
| style="text-align:right;" | 786
| style="text-align:right;" | 12.79%
| style="text-align:right;" | –
| style="text-align:right;" | $4,458.35
|-
| style="background:#ba0d1e;"|
| style="text-align:left;" | Kristina Heaton
| style="text-align:right;" | 658
| style="text-align:right;" | 10.71%
| style="text-align:right;" | –
| style="text-align:right;" | $0
|-
| style="background:#574fff;"|
| style="text-align:left;" | John Vail
| style="text-align:right;" | 373
| style="text-align:right;" | 6.07%
| style="text-align:right;" | –
| style="text-align:right;" | $2,608.70
|-
| style="background:#fff2e5;"|
| style="text-align:left;" | Ed Dallas
| style="text-align:right;" | 143
| style="text-align:right;" | 2.33%
| style="text-align:right;" | –
| style="text-align:right;" | n/a1
|-
| style="background:#a55709;"|
| style="text-align:left;" | Ryan Henry
| style="text-align:right;" | 108
| style="text-align:right;" | 1.76%
| style="text-align:right;" | –
| style="text-align:right;" |  n/a1
|-  style="text-align:right; background:#fff;"
| colspan="2"|Total votes
||6,389
||29.04%
||−11.39%
| style="text-align:right; background:#fff;"|
|-  style="text-align:right; background:#fff;"
| colspan="2"|Registered voters
||21,997
||100%
| style="text-align:right; background:#fff;"|
| style="text-align:right; background:#fff;"|
|-
| style="text-align:left;" colspan="6" |1 These candidates did not submit official Financial Statements and are, therefore, ineligible to run in the  2018 Municipal election Note: All Hamilton Municipal Elections are officially non-partisan.  Note: Candidate campaign colours are based on the prominent colour used in campaign items (signs, literature, etc.)and are used as a visual differentiation between candidates.
|-
| style="text-align:left;" colspan="13" |Sources: City of Hamilton, "Nominated Candidates" 
|}

Ward Three (Hamilton Centre)

The early days of the Ward Three race were marked by the prolonged illness of incumbent Councillor Bernie Morelli. 33-year-old entrepreneur Matthew Green was the first to indicate he would be seeking election, telling CBC Hamilton he would be running for council in Ward Three on October 26, 2013. Green's announcement was confirmed in a later CHML interview with Ted Michaels. Indicating that he wanted to make the announcement well before incumbent councillor Bernie Morelli decided if he would seek re-election, Green became the first candidate to file for the election on January 2, 2014. Green's campaign focused on safe streets, improving park infrastructure in the area, and conducting a comprehensive study of the city's transportation network.

In November 2013, Dreschel tweeted that Ward Three Catholic school board trustee Ralph Agostino would run for council if incumbent councillor Bernie Morelli was unable to stand for election. Agostino registered on February 13 after announcing his decision to run a day earlier. Agostino campaigned on a platform of rejuvenating Barton Street, holding more community meetings, and uploading service costs to the provincial government.

Near the end of November, 2013, Ward Three Public School Board trustee Tim Simmons announced he would be standing down as chair of the Hamilton-Wentworth District School Board to consider a run for Ward Three councillor. Simmons registered to run for council on January 6, 2014. In his campaign, Simmons spoke of wanting to create a municipal 'Housing Officer' and supporting more investment in express bus service prior to the completion of LRT.

Green and Simmons were among the announced candidates when Morelli died on January 14, 2014.  Writing about his life, Spectator columnist Andrew Dreschel noted his illness, his successes, and controversies, while making note of the void that would be left by his passing. Following Morelli's passing, the number of candidates for the vacant seat increased substantially, with 15 candidates registering by the September 12 deadline.

The campaign for council in Ward Three proved to be one of the most tense in the city, with a series of incidents marking the race to replace Morelli. In February 2014, candidate Bob Assadourian illegally used City of Hamilton logos and imagery on campaign advertisements that implied he was already the Ward Three councillor. During a mayoral debate in early October, a question was posed to candidates about gender equality and, when a number of candidates responded with misogynistic language, a community activist tried to interrupt the proceedings. Catholic school trustee candidate Anthony Perri shouted the activist down and Green live-tweeted the incident. Perri subsequently threatened Green with legal action over his tweets. Candidate Mark DiMillo's office was twice the target of burglary, which he attributed to the social issues at play in the community, rather than to sabotage from another campaign. In late October, Agostino issued a statement claiming candidate Drina Omazic's campaign literature plagiarized a flyer from his late brother Dominic Agostino and distributed it in the community on the former MPP's birthday. A YouTube video claimed to be linked to the hacktivist group Anonymous surfaced in October, claiming Green was running for office in a Freemason-inspired plot to dominate the city. Days before the election, Assadourian again came under fire for releasing an advertisement that claimed he was already the Ward Three councillor.

At advance polls in the area, a number of complaints were filed by multiple candidates about perceived irregularities, including campaign signs and vehicles located too close to polling stations and campaign supporters intimidating voters prior to their casting ballots. At an advance poll in Pinky Lewis Community Centre, a physical altercation erupted after a voter claimed another elector was displaying Green campaign material inside the polling station. Green expressed concern that one of his supporters was attacked while Assadourian claimed the woman did not intend to vote, but rather wanted to intimidate voters at the polling station. An investigation by the city's Elections Manager found no irregularities.

The campaigns of candidates across Ward Three were varied, with contenders running on diverse platforms focusing on distinct issues. Candidate Eva John focused on reducing chlorine in the city's water supply, Victor Mejia advocated a seniors' centre and express bus along Barton Street, Carlos Pinho called on business owners to donate 10% of their earnings to the community, Byron Wayne Millette campaigned on the idea of a 5,000-seat hockey arena in Ward Three, and Brian Kelly proposed a McMaster-to-south Mountain LRT line. Assadourian campaigned on a platform of BRT, donating 1/4 of his salary to the runner-up in the council election, removing what he called the "toxic substance" of fluoride from Hamilton's water, and not having any educational experience, which he cited as the reason "City Hall is in a mess!"

On election night, Green won the ward easily, earning over 40% of the popular vote and over 1,600 more votes than the runner-up, Agostino. Despite the interest in the race and the number of candidates, voter turnout still dropped below 30%.

|-
!rowspan="2" colspan="2"|Candidate
!colspan="3"|Popular vote
!rowspan="2" colspan="2"|Expenditures
|-
! Votes
! %
! ±%
|-
| style="background:#7bbd55;"|
| style="text-align:left;" | Matthew Green
| style="text-align:right;" |2,852	
| style="text-align:right;" |40.72%
| style="text-align:right;" | –
| style="text-align:right;" |$31,380.20
|-
| style="background:#f00;"|
| style="text-align:left;" | Ralph Agostino
| style="text-align:right;" |1,229	
| style="text-align:right;" |17.55%
| style="text-align:right;" | –
| style="text-align:right;" |$22,900.91
|-
| style="background:#de292b;"|
| style="text-align:left;" | Drina Omazic
| style="text-align:right;" |825
| style="text-align:right;" |11.78%
| style="text-align:right;" | –
| style="text-align:right;" |$27,000.76
|-
| style="background:#ef8b42;"|
| style="text-align:left;" | Mark DiMillo
| style="text-align:right;" |525
| style="text-align:right;" |7.50%
| style="text-align:right;" |−2.63%
| style="text-align:right;" | n/a1
|-
| style="background:#fff;"|
| style="text-align:left;" | Sean Gibson
| style="text-align:right;" |361
| style="text-align:right;" |5.15%
| style="text-align:right;" |−8.53%
| style="text-align:right;" | n/a1
|-
| style="background:#f73e1e;"|
| style="text-align:left;" | Tim Simmons
| style="text-align:right;" |334
| style="text-align:right;" |4.77%
| style="text-align:right;" | –
| style="text-align:right;" | $15,087.14
|-
| style="background:#062955;"|
| style="text-align:left;" | Bob Assadourian
| style="text-align:right;" |330	
| style="text-align:right;" |4.71%
| style="text-align:right;" | –
| style="text-align:right;" | $26,412.29
|-
| style="background:#fff;"|
| style="text-align:left;" | Brian Kelly
| style="text-align:right;" |172
| style="text-align:right;" |2.46%
| style="text-align:right;" | –
| style="text-align:right;" | $5,670.73
|-
| style="background:#fff;"|
| style="text-align:left;" | Maria Anastasiou
| style="text-align:right;" |93
| style="text-align:right;" |1.33%
| style="text-align:right;" | –
| style="text-align:right;" | n/a1
|-
| style="background:#fff;"|
| style="text-align:left;" | Byron Wayne Millette
| style="text-align:right;" |73
| style="text-align:right;" |1.04%
| style="text-align:right;" | –
| style="text-align:right;" | n/a1
|-
| style="background:#fff;"|
| style="text-align:left;" | Eva John
| style="text-align:right;" |55
| style="text-align:right;" |0.79%
| style="text-align:right;" | –
| style="text-align:right;" | n/a1
|-
| style="background:#fff;"|
| style="text-align:left;" | Carlos Pinho
| style="text-align:right;" |51
| style="text-align:right;" |0.73%
| style="text-align:right;" | –
| style="text-align:right;" | n/a1
|-
| style="background:#fff;"|
| style="text-align:left;" | Victor Mejia
| style="text-align:right;" |42
| style="text-align:right;" |0.60%
| style="text-align:right;" | –
| style="text-align:right;" | n/a1
|-
| style="background:#fff;"|
| style="text-align:left;" | Bernie Szajkowski
| style="text-align:right;" |41	
| style="text-align:right;" |0.59%
| style="text-align:right;" | –
| style="text-align:right;" | $0
|-
| style="background:#fff;"|
| style="text-align:left;" | Jol Hess
| style="text-align:right;" |21
| style="text-align:right;" |0.30%
| style="text-align:right;" | –
| style="text-align:right;" | n/a1
|- style="text-align:right;" 
| style="background:#fff;" colspan="2"|Total votes
| style="background:#fff;"|7,113
| style="background:#fff;"|29.59%
| style="background:#fff;"|−1.41
| style="text-align:right;" |
|- style="text-align:right;"  
| style="background:#fff;" colspan="2"|Registered voters
| style="background:#fff;"|24,035
| style="background:#fff;"|100%
| style="text-align:right; background:#fff;"|
| style="text-align:right;" |
|- 
| style="text-align:left;" colspan="6" |1 These candidates did not submit official Financial Statements and are, therefore, ineligible to run in the  2018 Municipal election  Note: All Hamilton Municipal Elections are officially non-partisan.  Note: Candidate campaign colours are based on the prominent colour used in campaign items (signs, literature, etc.)and are used as a visual differentiation between candidates.
|- 
| style="text-align:left;" colspan="13" |Sources: City of Hamilton, "Nominated Candidates" 
|}

Ward Four (East Hamilton)

Incumbent councillor Sam Merulla told CBC Hamilton that he would be seeking election in 2014, hoping to file his nomination papers on January 2. Due to extreme weather, Merulla filed on January 3.

Activist Lorna Moreau registered to run against Merulla on July 11. In a Spectator editorial on July 28, Moreau outlined her reasons for running and the platform she would be standing on. Indicating that she was "disillusioned with [her] city councillor and city hall on the whole", Moreau said she would be campaigning on a platform of addressing capital spending deficits, opposing LRT, starting resident-led committees, helping seniors stay in their homes, tackling air quality issues, and hiring student veterinarians to spay and neuter the stray animals in the ward. Moreau also waded into the school board election by noting that she wanted to see more equality in education and school spaces used for job retraining and community events.

|-
!rowspan="2" colspan="2"|Candidate
!colspan="3"|Popular vote
!rowspan="2" colspan="2"|Expenditures
|-
! Votes
! %
! ±%
|-
| style="background:#ff7f00;"|
| style="text-align:left;" | Sam Merulla (incumbent)
| style="text-align:right;" |5,654
| style="text-align:right;" |82.49%
| style="text-align:right;" |+.08
| style="text-align:right;" |$28,042.00
|-
| style="background:#fff;"|
| style="text-align:left;" | Tina Whalen
| style="text-align:right;" |563
| style="text-align:right;" |8.21%
| style="text-align:right;" | –
| style="text-align:right;" | n/a1
|-
| style="background:#fff;"|
| style="text-align:left;" | Lorna Moreau
| style="text-align:right;" |407
| style="text-align:right;" |5.94%
| style="text-align:right;" | –
| style="text-align:right;" | $996.22
|-
| style="background:#fff;"|
| style="text-align:left;" | John Laurie
| style="text-align:right;" |230	
| style="text-align:right;" |3.36%
| style="text-align:right;" | –
| style="text-align:right;" | n/a1
|- style="text-align:right;" 
| style="background:#fff;" colspan="2"|Total votes
| style="background:#fff;"|6,956
| style="background:#fff;"|29.87%
| style="background:#fff;"|−5.63%
| style="text-align:right;" |
|- style="text-align:right;"  
| style="background:#fff;" colspan="2"|Registered voters
| style="background:#fff;"|23,287
| style="background:#fff;"|100%
| style="text-align:right; background:#fff;"|
| style="text-align:right;" |
|- 
| style="text-align:left;" colspan="6" |1 These candidates did not submit official Financial Statements and are, therefore, ineligible to run in the  2018 Municipal election  Note: All Hamilton Municipal Elections are officially non-partisan.  Note: Candidate campaign colours are based on the prominent colour used in campaign items (signs, literature, etc.)and are used as a visual differentiation between candidates.
|- 
| style="text-align:left;" colspan="13" |Sources: City of Hamilton, "Nominated Candidates" 
|}

Ward Five (Redhill)

|-
!rowspan="2" colspan="2"|Candidate
!colspan="3"|Popular vote
!rowspan="2" colspan="2"|Expenditures
|-
! Votes
! %
! ±%
|-
| style="background:#f00;"|
| style="text-align:left;" | Chad Collins (incumbent)
| style="text-align:right;" |6,138
| style="text-align:right;" |71.58%
| style="text-align:right;" | +4.66%
| style="text-align:right;" |$22,484.82
|-
| style="background:#2424e2;"|
| style="text-align:left;" | David Brown
| style="text-align:right;" |1,134
| style="text-align:right;" |13.22%
| style="text-align:right;" | –
| style="text-align:right;" |$11,977.84
|-
| style="background:#b1e85f;"|
| style="text-align:left;" | George Rusich
| style="text-align:right;" |1,133
| style="text-align:right;" |13.21%
| style="text-align:right;" | –
| style="text-align:right;" |$4,305.38
|-
| style="background:#c4bea4;"|
| style="text-align:left;" | Larry Storm
| style="text-align:right;" |170
| style="text-align:right;" |1.98%
| style="text-align:right;" | –
| style="text-align:right;" |$453.27
|- style="text-align:right;" 
| style="background:#fff;" colspan="2"|Total votes
| style="background:#fff;"|8,723
| style="background:#fff;"|33.64%
| style="background:#fff;"|−7.66%
| style="text-align:right;" |
|- style="text-align:right;" 
| style="background:#fff;" colspan="2"|Registered voters
| style="background:#fff;"|25,929
| style="background:#fff;"|100%
| style="text-align:right; background:#fff;"|
| style="text-align:right;" |
|-
| style="text-align:left;" colspan="6" |1 These candidates did not submit official Financial Statements and are, therefore, ineligible to run in the  2018 Municipal election  Note: All Hamilton Municipal Elections are officially non-partisan.  Note: Candidate campaign colours are based on the prominent colour used in campaign items (signs, literature, etc.)and are used as a visual differentiation between candidates.
|-
| style="text-align:left;" colspan="13" |Sources: City of Hamilton, "Nominated Candidates" 
|}

Ward Six (East Mountain)

26-year council veteran Tom Jackson told Mark Newman of Hamilton Community News in January, 2014 that he intended to seek re-election. Jackson registered to run for a ninth term on July 3, 2014.

Brad Olynchuk, the first candidate to register in the ward, withdrew from the race on March 24. Then, on September 11, he again filed to run in Ward Six. The reasoning for his withdrawal and renomination were not made public.

|-
!rowspan="2" colspan="2"|Candidate
!colspan="3"|Popular vote
!rowspan="2" colspan="2"|Expenditures
|-
! Votes
! %
! ±%
|-
| style="background:#002e63;"|
| style="text-align:left;" | Tom Jackson (incumbent)
| style="text-align:right;" |7,886
| style="text-align:right;" |80.83%
| style="text-align:right;" |+25.93%
| style="text-align:right;" |$63,130.32
|-
| style="background:#0965b3;"|
| style="text-align:left;" | Dan Rodrigues
| style="text-align:right;" |1,125
| style="text-align:right;" |11.53%
| style="text-align:right;" | –
| style="text-align:right;" | n/a1
|-
| style="background:#271c87;"|
| style="text-align:left;" | Brad Olynchuk
| style="text-align:right;" |745
| style="text-align:right;" |7.64%
| style="text-align:right;" | –
| style="text-align:right;" |$0
|-  style="text-align:right; background:#fff;"
| colspan="2"|Total votes
||9,883
||35.15%
||−7.95%
| style="text-align:right; background:#fff;"|
|-  style="text-align:right; background:#fff;"
| colspan="2"|Registered voters
||28,116
| style="text-align:right; background:#fff;"|
| style="text-align:right; background:#fff;"|
| style="text-align:right; background:#fff;"|
|- 
| style="text-align:left;" colspan="6" |1 These candidates did not submit official Financial Statements and are, therefore, ineligible to run in the  2018 Municipal election  Note: All Hamilton Municipal Elections are officially non-partisan.  Note: Candidate campaign colours are based on the prominent colour used in campaign items (signs, literature, etc.)and are used as a visual differentiation between candidates.
|- 
| style="text-align:left;" colspan="13" |Sources: City of Hamilton, "Nominated Candidates" 
|}

Ward Seven (Central Mountain)

|-
!rowspan="2" colspan="2"|Candidate
!colspan="3"|Popular vote
!rowspan="2" colspan="2"|Expenditures
|-
! Votes
! %
! ±%
|-
| style="background:#ff7f00;"|
| style="text-align:left;" | Scott Duvall (incumbent)
| style="text-align:right;" |9,956
| style="text-align:right;" |79.12%
| style="text-align:right;" |+21.51%
| style="text-align:right;" |$16,626.25
|-
| style="background:#aaf442;"|
| style="text-align:left;" | Keith Beck
| style="text-align:right;" |1,562
| style="text-align:right;" |12.41%
| style="text-align:right;" | +7.27
| style="text-align:right;" | $0
|-
| style="background:#4c38ff;"|
| style="text-align:left;" | Greg Burghall
| style="text-align:right;" |1,065
| style="text-align:right;" |8.46%
| style="text-align:right;" | –
| style="text-align:right;" | n/a1
|-  style="text-align:right; background:#fff;"
| colspan="2"|Total votes
||13,068
||31.75%
||−8.15%
| style="text-align:right; background:#fff;"|
|-  style="text-align:right; background:#fff;"
| colspan="2"|Registered voters
| style="text-align:right; background:#fff;"|
| style="text-align:right; background:#fff;"|
| style="text-align:right; background:#fff;"|
| style="text-align:right; background:#fff;"|
|- 
| style="text-align:left;" colspan="6" |1 These candidates did not submit official Financial Statements and are, therefore, ineligible to run in the  2018 Municipal election  Note: All Hamilton Municipal Elections are officially non-partisan.  Note: Candidate campaign colours are based on the prominent colour used in campaign items (signs, literature, etc.)and are used as a visual differentiation between candidates.
|- 
| style="text-align:left;" colspan="13" |Sources: City of Hamilton, "Nominated Candidates" 
|}

Ward Eight (West Mountain)

The first candidate to register in the West Mountain race was Jimmy Dean, who filed his nomination papers on March 21. Speaking with the Mountain News, Dean indicated that he opposed the city's proposed LRT, wanted to see better road maintenance, and expressed a desire to examine community snow-removal for seniors.

|-
!rowspan="2" colspan="2"|Candidate
!colspan="3"|Popular vote
!rowspan="2" colspan="2"|Expenditures
|-
! Votes
! %
! ±%
|-
| style="background:#ff0800;"|
| style="text-align:left;" | Terry Whitehead (incumbent)
| style="text-align:right;" | 9,364
| style="text-align:right;" | 76.54%
| style="text-align:right;" |+9.17%
| style="text-align:right;" | $29,517.87
|-
| style="background:#ff73ec;"|
| style="text-align:left;" | Joshua Peter Czerniga
| style="text-align:right;" | 2,870
| style="text-align:right;" | 23.46%
| style="text-align:right;" | –
| style="text-align:right;" | n/a1
|-  style="text-align:right; background:#fff;"
| colspan="2"|Total votes
||12,554
||36.29%
| style="text-align:right; background:#fff;"|
| style="text-align:right; background:#fff;"|
|-  style="text-align:right; background:#fff;"
| colspan="2"|Registered voters
| style="text-align:right; background:#fff;"|
| style="text-align:right; background:#fff;"|
| style="text-align:right; background:#fff;"|
| style="text-align:right; background:#fff;"|
|- 
| style="text-align:left;" colspan="6" |1 These candidates did not submit official Financial Statements and are, therefore, ineligible to run in the  2018 Municipal election  Note: All Hamilton Municipal Elections are officially non-partisan.  Note: Candidate campaign colours are based on the prominent colour used in campaign items (signs, literature, etc.)and are used as a visual differentiation between candidates.
|- 
| style="text-align:left;" colspan="13" |Sources: City of Hamilton, "Nominated Candidates" 
|}

Ward Nine (Upper Stoney Creek)

The Ward Nine council race opened in earnest when sitting councillor and former MPP Brad Clark surprised observers by quietly registering to contest the mayoralty following Bob Bratina's announcement that he would not seek a second term in office. The first candidate to register was Marie Robbins, a local resident, former owner of Smith-McKay Florists, and founder of the Jamesville Business Improvement Area on March 31. On May 8, 19-year-old McMaster University student Cam Galindo registered to run in Stoney Creek. Doug Conley, a former councillor in the now defunct City of Stoney Creek, registered the next day. Also of note was the registration of former mayoral candidate and actor, Tone Morrone on July 28.

|-
!rowspan="2" colspan="2"|Candidate
!colspan="3"|Popular vote
!rowspan="2" colspan="2"|Expenditures
|-
! Votes
! %
! ±%
|-
| style="background:#ccc;"|
| style="text-align:left;" | Doug Conley
| style="text-align:right;" |1,750
| style="text-align:right;" |26.17%
| style="text-align:right;" | –
| style="text-align:right;" |$17,842.99
|-
| style="background:#a34547;"|
| style="text-align:left;" | Nancy Fiorentino
| style="text-align:right;" |1,381
| style="text-align:right;" |20.66%
| style="text-align:right;" |−10.09%
| style="text-align:right;" |$7,097.31
|-
| style="background:#213b5d;"|
| style="text-align:left;" | Cam Galindo
| style="text-align:right;" |1,294
| style="text-align:right;" |19.35%
| style="text-align:right;" |  –
| style="text-align:right;" |$7,273.19
|-
| style="background:#0892d0;"|
| style="text-align:left;" | Marie Robbins
| style="text-align:right;" |1,063
| style="text-align:right;" |15.90%
| style="text-align:right;" | –
| style="text-align:right;" | $12,927.68
|-
| style="background:#981932;"|
| style="text-align:left;" | Geraldine McMullen
| style="text-align:right;" | 682
| style="text-align:right;" |10.20%
| style="text-align:right;" |−2.91%
| style="text-align:right;" | $18,974.15
|-
| style="background:#ff001a;"|
| style="text-align:left;" | Tone Marrone
| style="text-align:right;" | 194
| style="text-align:right;" | 2.90%
| style="text-align:right;" | –
| style="text-align:right;" | n/a1
|-
| style="background:#3f0002;"|
| style="text-align:left;" | Frank Rukavina
| style="text-align:right;" |189
| style="text-align:right;" |2.83%
| style="text-align:right;" | –
| style="text-align:right;" | $157.89
|-
| style="background:#fff;"|
| style="text-align:left;" | Lee Austin
| style="text-align:right;" |81
| style="text-align:right;" |1.21%
| style="text-align:right;" | –
| style="text-align:right;" | n/a1
|-
| style="background:#1e416f;"|
| style="text-align:left;" | Christopher Rosser
| style="text-align:right;" |52
| style="text-align:right;" |0.78%
| style="text-align:right;" | –
| style="text-align:right;" | n/a1
|-  style="text-align:right; background:#fff;"
| colspan="2"|Total votes
||6,826
||34.20%
||−6.1%
| style="text-align:right; background:#fff;"|
|-  style="text-align:right; background:#fff;"
| colspan="2"|Registered voters
| style="text-align:right; background:#fff;"|
| style="text-align:right; background:#fff;"|
| style="text-align:right; background:#fff;"|
| style="text-align:right; background:#fff;"|
|- 
| style="text-align:left;" colspan="6" |1 These candidates did not submit official Financial Statements and are, therefore, ineligible to run in the  2018 Municipal election  Note: All Hamilton Municipal Elections are officially non-partisan.  Note: Candidate campaign colours are based on the prominent colour used in campaign items (signs, literature, etc.)and are used as a visual differentiation between candidates.
|- 
| style="text-align:left;" colspan="13" |Sources: City of Hamilton, "Nominated Candidates" 
|}

Ward Ten (Lower Stoney Creek)

|-
!rowspan="2" colspan="2"|Candidate
!colspan="3"|Popular vote
!rowspan="2" colspan="2"|Expenditures
|-
! Votes
! %
! ±%
|-
| style="background:#ed1c24;"|
| style="text-align:left;" | Maria Pearson (Incumbent)
| style="text-align:right;" |4,090
| style="text-align:right;" |58.03%
| style="text-align:right;" |−5.82%
| style="text-align:right;" |$19,436.79
|-
| style="background:#6e10c5;"|
| style="text-align:left;" | Teresa DiFalco
| style="text-align:right;" |2,390
| style="text-align:right;" |33.91%
| style="text-align:right;" | –
| style="text-align:right;" |$16,957.88
|-
| style="background:#fff;"|
| style="text-align:left;" | Luana Yachetti
| style="text-align:right;" |568
| style="text-align:right;" |8.06%
| style="text-align:right;" | –
| style="text-align:right;" |$5,586.28
|-  style="text-align:right; background:#fff;"
| colspan="2"|Total votes
||7,145
||37.4%
||−7.93%
| style="text-align:right; background:#fff;"|
|-  style="text-align:right; background:#fff;"
| colspan="2"|Registered voters
||19,106
| style="text-align:right; background:#fff;"|
| style="text-align:right; background:#fff;"|
| style="text-align:right; background:#fff;"|
|- 
| style="text-align:left;" colspan="6" |1 These candidates did not submit official Financial Statements and are, therefore, ineligible to run in the  2018 Municipal election  Note: All Hamilton Municipal Elections are officially non-partisan.  Note: Candidate campaign colours are based on the prominent colour used in campaign items (signs, literature, etc.)and are used as a visual differentiation between candidates.
|- 
| style="text-align:left;" colspan="13" |Sources: City of Hamilton, "Nominated Candidates" 
|}

Ward Eleven (Glanbrook Winona)

|-
!rowspan="2" colspan="2"|Candidate
!colspan="3"|Popular vote
!rowspan="2" colspan="2"|Expenditures
|-
! Votes
! %
! ±%
|-
| style="background:#66b032;"|
| style="text-align:left;" | Brenda Johnson (incumbent)
| style="text-align:right;" |7,873
| style="text-align:right;" |83.45%
| style="text-align:right;" |+41.31%
| style="text-align:right;" |$13,065.70
|-
| style="background:#fff;"|
| style="text-align:left;" | Vincenzo Rigitano
| style="text-align:right;" |1,561
| style="text-align:right;" |16.55%
| style="text-align:right;" | –
| style="text-align:right;" |$5,321.11
|-  style="text-align:right; background:#fff;"
| colspan="2"|Total votes
||9,562
||33.61%
||−9.69%
| style="text-align:right; background:#fff;"|
|-  style="text-align:right; background:#fff;"
| colspan="2"|Registered voters
||28,451
| style="text-align:right; background:#fff;"|
| style="text-align:right; background:#fff;"|
| style="text-align:right; background:#fff;"|
|- 
| style="text-align:left;" colspan="6" |1 These candidates did not submit official Financial Statements and are, therefore, ineligible to run in the  2018 Municipal election Note: All Hamilton Municipal Elections are officially non-partisan.  Note: Candidate campaign colours are based on the prominent colour used in campaign items (signs, literature, etc.)and are used as a visual differentiation between candidates.
|- 
| style="text-align:left;" colspan="13" |Sources: Hamilton, Ontario, City Clerk's Office 
|}

Ward Twelve (Ancaster)

|-
!rowspan="2" colspan="2"|Candidate
!colspan="3"|Popular vote
!rowspan="2" colspan="2"|Expenditures
|-
! Votes
! %
! ±%
|-
| style="background:#c32148;"|
| style="text-align:left;" | Lloyd Ferguson (incumbent)
| style="text-align:right;" |7,313
| style="text-align:right;" |78.75%
| style="text-align:right;" |+5.47%
| style="text-align:right;" |$36,072.46
|-
| style="background:#fff;"|
| style="text-align:left;" | John F.F. Iachelli
| style="text-align:right;" |727
| style="text-align:right;" |7.83%
| style="text-align:right;" | –
| style="text-align:right;" |$5,864.88
|-
| style="background:#fff;"|
| style="text-align:left;" | Grace Bryson
| style="text-align:right;" |650
| style="text-align:right;" |7.00%
| style="text-align:right;" | –
| style="text-align:right;" |$1,200.62
|-
| style="background:#fff;"|
| style="text-align:left;" | Anthony Nicholl
| style="text-align:right;" |596
| style="text-align:right;" |6.42%
| style="text-align:right;" | –
| style="text-align:right;" |$1,214.59
|-  style="text-align:right; background:#fff;"
| colspan="2"|Total votes
||9,445
||35.90%
||−4.8%
| style="text-align:right; background:#fff;"|
|-  style="text-align:right; background:#fff;"
| colspan="2"|Registered voters
||26,309
| style="text-align:right; background:#fff;"|
| style="text-align:right; background:#fff;"|
| style="text-align:right; background:#fff;"|
|- 
| style="text-align:left;" colspan="6" |1 These candidates did not submit official Financial Statements and are, therefore, ineligible to run in the  2018 Municipal election Note: All Hamilton Municipal Elections are officially non-partisan.  Note: Candidate campaign colours are based on the prominent colour used in campaign items (signs, literature, etc.)and are used as a visual differentiation between candidates.
|- 
| style="text-align:left;" colspan="13" |Sources: Hamilton, Ontario, City Clerk's Office 
|}

Ward Thirteen (Dundas)

Danya Scime, runner up to Incumbent Russ Powers in the 2010 Election, was first to file on January 20, 2014.

On June 26, 2014, incumbent councillor Russ Powers announced he would be retiring from municipal politics after serving for 27 years as a town councillor in Dundas, regional councillor in the former region of Hamilton-Wentworth, and as Ancaster—Dundas—Flamborough—Westdale MP from 2004 to 2006. Cited as a potential Liberal nominee for the newly created riding of Hamilton West-Ancaster-Dundas, Powers told the Spectator that he was keeping his mind open on running for office in 2015, but was looking forward to enjoying retirement when his term ended in December, 2014.

Immediately after his announcement, a number of Dundas residents announced their intentions to stand for council. Local businesswoman Toby Yull and Powers' executive assistant and former federal Liberal candidate in Ancaster-Dundas-Flambrough-Westdale Arlene Vanderbeek both announced their intention to stand on July 2, 2014. Yull filed to run the following day along with local resident and automotive engineer Marc Risdale.

|-
!rowspan="2" colspan="2"|Candidate
!colspan="3"|Popular vote
!rowspan="2" colspan="2"|Expenditures
|-
! Votes
! %
! ±%
|-
| style="background:#1138c6;"|
| style="text-align:left;" | Arlene Vanderbeek
| style="text-align:right;" |3,468
| style="text-align:right;" |42.56%
| style="text-align:right;" | –
| style="text-align:right;" |$20,475.72
|-
| style="background:#fdd84e;"|
| style="text-align:left;" | Toby Yull
| style="text-align:right;" |1,988
| style="text-align:right;" |24.40%
| style="text-align:right;" | –
| style="text-align:right;" |$11,673.01
|-
| style="background:#47a9da;"|
| style="text-align:left;" | Rick Court
| style="text-align:right;" |1,285
| style="text-align:right;" |15.77%
| style="text-align:right;" | –
| style="text-align:right;" |$16,479.08
|-
| style="background:#00009c;"|
| style="text-align:left;" | Danya Scime
| style="text-align:right;" |516
| style="text-align:right;" |6.33%
| style="text-align:right;" | −14.92%
| style="text-align:right;" |n/a1
|-
| style="background:#ff762a;"|
| style="text-align:left;" | Marc Rhéal Risdale
| style="text-align:right;" |397
| style="text-align:right;" |4.87%
| style="text-align:right;" | –
| style="text-align:right;" |$4,561.53
|-
| style="background:#411095;"|
| style="text-align:left;" | Mark Coull
| style="text-align:right;" |283
| style="text-align:right;" |3.47%
| style="text-align:right;" | –
| style="text-align:right;" |$1,431.72
|-
| style="background:#fff;"|
| style="text-align:left;" | Pam Mitchell
| style="text-align:right;" |82
| style="text-align:right;" |1.01%
| style="text-align:right;" | –
| style="text-align:right;" |$0
|-
| style="background:#fff;"|
| style="text-align:left;" | Kevin Norton
| style="text-align:right;" |77
| style="text-align:right;" |0.94%
| style="text-align:right;" | –
| style="text-align:right;" |$0
|-
| style="background:#fff;"|
| style="text-align:left;" | Christeen Urquhart
| style="text-align:right;" |53
| style="text-align:right;" |0.65%
| style="text-align:right;" | –
| style="text-align:right;" |$0
|-  style="text-align:right; background:#fff;"
| colspan="2"|Total votes
||8,258
||43.79%
||−2.04%
| style="text-align:right; background:#fff;"|
|-  style="text-align:right; background:#fff;"
| colspan="2"|Registered voters
||18,859
| style="text-align:right; background:#fff;"|
| style="text-align:right; background:#fff;"|
| style="text-align:right; background:#fff;"|
|- 
| style="text-align:left;" colspan="6" |1 These candidates did not submit official Financial Statements and are, therefore, ineligible to run in the  2018 Municipal election  Note: All Hamilton Municipal Elections are officially non-partisan.  Note: Candidate campaign colours are based on the prominent colour used in campaign items (signs, literature, etc.)and are used as a visual differentiation between candidates.
|- 
| style="text-align:left;" colspan="13" |Sources: Hamilton, Ontario, City Clerk's Office 
|}

Ward Fourteen (Wentworth)

|-
!rowspan="2" colspan="2"|Candidate
!colspan="3"|Popular vote
!rowspan="2" colspan="2"|Expenditures
|-
! Votes
! %
! ±%
|-
| style="background:#ffbf00;"|
| style="text-align:left;" | Robert Pasuta (incumbent)
| style="text-align:right;" |3,451
| style="text-align:right;" |85.38%
| style="text-align:right;" | –2
| style="text-align:right;" |$12,677.09
|-
| style="background:#fff;"|
| style="text-align:left;" | Scott Stewart
| style="text-align:right;" |421
| style="text-align:right;" |10.42%
| style="text-align:right;" | –
| style="text-align:right;" |$3,032.65
|-
| style="background:#fff;"|
| style="text-align:left;" | Steven Knowles
| style="text-align:right;" |170
| style="text-align:right;" |4.21%
| style="text-align:right;" | –
| style="text-align:right;" |n/a1
|-  style="text-align:right; background:#fff;"
| colspan="2"|Total votes
||4,119
||33.41%
|| –2
| style="text-align:right; background:#fff;"|
|-  style="text-align:right; background:#fff;"
| colspan="2"|Registered voters
||12,329
| style="text-align:right; background:#fff;"|
| style="text-align:right; background:#fff;"|
| style="text-align:right; background:#fff;"|
|- 
| style="text-align:left;" colspan="6" |1 These candidates did not submit official Financial Statements and are, therefore, ineligible to run in the  2018 Municipal election 2 Robert Pasuta was acclaimed in the 2014 Municipal election Note: All Hamilton Municipal Elections are officially non-partisan.  Note: Candidate campaign colours are based on the prominent colour used in campaign items (signs, literature, etc.)and are used as a visual differentiation between candidates.
|- 
| style="text-align:left;" colspan="13" |Sources: Hamilton, Ontario, City Clerk's Office 
|}

Ward Fifteen (Flamborough)

|-
!rowspan="2" colspan="2"|Candidate
!colspan="3"|Popular vote
!rowspan="2" colspan="2"|Expenditures
|-
! Votes
! %
! ±%
|-
| style="background:#fdee00;"|
| style="text-align:left;" | Judi Partridge (Incumbent)
| style="text-align:right;" |3,879
| style="text-align:right;" |69.23%
| style="text-align:right;" |+16.51%
| style="text-align:right;" |$17,600.00
|-
| style="background:#b31b1b;"|
| style="text-align:left;" | Neil Bos
| style="text-align:right;" |1,724
| style="text-align:right;" |30.77%
| style="text-align:right;" |−12.18%
| style="text-align:right;" |$5,358.57
|-  style="text-align:right; background:#fff;"
| colspan="2"|Total votes
||5,639
||27.88%
||−7.19%
| style="text-align:right; background:#fff;"|
|-  style="text-align:right; background:#fff;"
| colspan="2"|Registered voters
||20,227
| style="text-align:right; background:#fff;"|
| style="text-align:right; background:#fff;"|
| style="text-align:right; background:#fff;"|
|- 
| style="text-align:left;" colspan="6" |1 These candidates did not submit official Financial Statements and are, therefore, ineligible to run in the  2018 Municipal election Note: All Hamilton Municipal Elections are officially non-partisan.  Note: Candidate campaign colours are based on the prominent colour used in campaign items (signs, literature, etc.)and are used as a visual differentiation between candidates.
|- 
| style="text-align:left;" colspan="13" |Sources: Hamilton, Ontario, City Clerk's Office 
|}

Public School Board trustee elections

The 2014 HWDSB trustee elections were marked by the high number of incumbents who declined to seek reelection. Judith Bishop (Wards 1&2), Laura Peddle (Ward 6), Lillian Orban (Ward 7), interim trustee Shirley Glauser (Wards 9&10), and Karen Turkstra (Wards 14&15) all chose to leave politics while Tim Simmons (Ward 3) registered to run for city council. With six departures, only five trustees from the 2010–2014 term attempted a return to the board.

Wards One and Two (West Lower City)
Chris Erl, a candidate for the Public School Board trustee vacancy in August 2013 announced on October 27, 2013, that he would be seeking election in Wards One and Two. He filed on January 8, 2014. On March 28, Grant Thomas, who had registered on January 9, withdrew from the race. This coincided with the nomination of Christine Bingham, the chair of the parent council at Parkview High School, a local special needs school. On July 9, Ed Sculthorpe, a local small business owner and veteran registered to run in Wards One and Two. Soon after, 26-year incumbent Judith Bishop announced she would not be seeking re-election. Brian Gage, who previously served as Trustee for Ward One from 1994 to 1997 before the number of trustees per seat was reduced to one, registered on August 28. Simon Granat, a staffer with Hamilton Centre MP David Christopherson, was the last to enter the race on August 29.

|-
!rowspan="2" colspan="2"|Candidate
!colspan="3"|Popular vote
!rowspan="2" colspan="2"|Expenditures
|-
! Votes
! %
! ±%
|-
| style="background:#048edf;"|
| style="text-align:left;" | Christine Bingham
| style="text-align:right;" |3,337
| style="text-align:right;" |30.75%
| style="text-align:right;" | –
| style="text-align:right;" |$974.20
|-
| style="background:#006388;"|
| style="text-align:left;" | Brian Gage
| style="text-align:right;" |2,503
| style="text-align:right;" |23.06%
| style="text-align:right;" | – 
| style="text-align:right;" |$7,190.00
|-
| style="background:#5daa3e;"|
| style="text-align:left;" | Ed Sculthorpe
| style="text-align:right;" |1,938
| style="text-align:right;" |17.86%
| style="text-align:right;" | – 
| style="text-align:right;" |$5,416.35
|-
| style="background:#6ca0dc;"|
| style="text-align:left;" | Simon Granat
| style="text-align:right;" |1,739
| style="text-align:right;" |16.02%
| style="text-align:right;" | – 
| style="text-align:right;" |$4,930.11
|-
| style="background:#ffba00;"|
| style="text-align:left;" | Chris Erl
| style="text-align:right;" |1,335
| style="text-align:right;" |12.3%
| style="text-align:right;" | – 
| style="text-align:right;" |$2,507.21
|-  style="text-align:right; background:#fff;"
| colspan="2"|Total Votes
||10,852
||24.79%
| style="text-align:right; background:#fff;"|
| style="text-align:right; background:#fff;"|
|-  style="text-align:right; background:#fff;"
| colspan="2"|Registered Voters
||43,767
||100%
| style="text-align:right; background:#fff;"|
| style="text-align:right; background:#fff;"|
|- 
| style="text-align:left;" colspan="6" |1 These candidates did not submit official Financial Statements and are, therefore, ineligible to run in the  2018 Municipal election  Note: All Hamilton Municipal Elections are officially non-partisan.  Note: Candidate campaign colours are based on the prominent colour used in campaign items (signs, literature, etc.)and are used as a visual differentiation between candidates.
|- 
| style="text-align:left;" colspan="13" |Sources: City of Hamilton, "Nominated Candidates" 
|}

Ward Three (Lower City)

The Ward Three trustee race was marked by the decision of the incumbent, Tim Simmons, to seek election to city council. The first candidate to register in the ward was Larry Pattison, a local father. Speaking with The Hamiltonian, Pattison indicated he opposed school closures, wanted to strengthen the relationship between the school board and city council, and saw schools as community hubs.

The second contender in the race was Michael Adkins, a member of the City of Hamilton's Municipal Heritage Committee and retired family counsellor who finished second in the Ward Three trustee race in 2006. In an early interview with The Hamiltonian, Adkins did not provide details about his platform, but was quoted as saying, "I am well aware of the complications and difficulties in pleasing all of the people all of the time but will endeavor to be the voice for as many families as I possibly can."

|-
!rowspan="2" colspan="2"|Candidate
!colspan="3"|Popular vote
!rowspan="2" colspan="2"|Expenditures
|-
! Votes
! %
! ±%
|-
| style="background:#fefe06;"|
| style="text-align:left;" | Larry Thomas Pattison Jr.
| style="text-align:right;" |1,587
| style="text-align:right;" |34.73%
| style="text-align:right;" | –
| style="text-align:right;" |$2,933.23
|-
| style="background:#af1536;"|
| style="text-align:left;" | Michael Adkins
| style="text-align:right;" |1,237	
| style="text-align:right;" |27.07%
| style="text-align:right;" | –
| style="text-align:right;" |n/a1
|-
| style="background:#212460;"|
| style="text-align:left;" | Erick Monterozza
| style="text-align:right;" |977	
| style="text-align:right;" |21.38%
| style="text-align:right;" | –
| style="text-align:right;" |$6,311.09
|-
| style="background:#18c938;"|
| style="text-align:left;" | Steven Paul Denault
| style="text-align:right;" |453
| style="text-align:right;" |9.91%
| style="text-align:right;" | –
| style="text-align:right;" |$1,050.00
|-
| style="background:#19b6db;"|
| style="text-align:left;" | Jeremy Paul Fritchley
| style="text-align:right;" |315
| style="text-align:right;" |6.89%
| style="text-align:right;" | –
| style="text-align:right;" |n/a1
|-  style="text-align:right; background:#fff;"
| colspan="2"|Total Votes
||4,569
||19.01%
| style="text-align:right; background:#fff;"|
| style="text-align:right; background:#fff;"|
|-  style="text-align:right; background:#fff;"
| colspan="2"|Registered Voters
||24,035
| style="text-align:right; background:#fff;"|
| style="text-align:right; background:#fff;"|
| style="text-align:right; background:#fff;"|
|-
| style="text-align:left;" colspan="6" |1 These candidates did not submit official Financial Statements and are, therefore, ineligible to run in the  2018 Municipal election Note: All Hamilton Municipal Elections are officially non-partisan.  Note: Candidate campaign colours are based on the prominent colour used in campaign items (signs, literature, etc.)and are used as a visual differentiation between candidates.
|-
| style="text-align:left;" colspan="13" |Sources: City of Hamilton, "Nominated Candidates" 
|}

Ward Four (East Lower City)

|-
!rowspan="2" colspan="2"|Candidate
!colspan="3"|Popular vote
!rowspan="2" colspan="2"|Expenditures
|-
! Votes
! %
! ±%
|-
| style="background:#8db600;"|
| style="text-align:left;" | Ray E. Mulholland (Incumbent)
| style="text-align:right;" |2,410
| style="text-align:right;" |49.21%
| style="text-align:right;" |+0.63%
| style="text-align:right;" |$2,856.00
|-
| style="background:#9bddff;"|
| style="text-align:left;" | Cindy Kennedy
| style="text-align:right;" |954
| style="text-align:right;" |19.48%
| style="text-align:right;" |−5.01%
| style="text-align:right;" |$0
|-
| style="background:#72d392;"|
| style="text-align:left;" | Sandra Lindsay 
| style="text-align:right;" |882
| style="text-align:right;" |18.01%
| style="text-align:right;" | –
| style="text-align:right;" |$0
|-
| style="background:#48065e;"|
| style="text-align:left;" | Linda Chenoweth
| style="text-align:right;" |651
| style="text-align:right;" |13.29%
| style="text-align:right;" | –
| style="text-align:right;" |$1,345.24
|-  style="text-align:right; background:#fff;"
| colspan="2"|Total Votes
||4,897
||21.02%
| style="text-align:right; background:#fff;"|
| style="text-align:right; background:#fff;"|
|-  style="text-align:right; background:#fff;"
| colspan="2"|Registered Voters
||23,287
| style="text-align:right; background:#fff;"|
| style="text-align:right; background:#fff;"|
| style="text-align:right; background:#fff;"|
|- 
| style="text-align:left;" colspan="6" |1 These candidates did not submit official Financial Statements and are, therefore, ineligible to run in the  2018 Municipal election Note: All Hamilton Municipal Elections are officially non-partisan.  Note: Candidate campaign colours are based on the prominent colour used in campaign items (signs, literature, etc.)and are used as a visual differentiation between candidates.
|- 
| style="text-align:left;" colspan="13" |Sources: City of Hamilton, "Nominated Candidates" 
|}

Ward Five (East City)

|-
!rowspan="2" colspan="2"|Candidate
!colspan="3"|Popular vote
!rowspan="2" colspan="2"|Expenditures
|-
! Votes
! %
! ±%
|-
| style="background:#ff7e00;"|
| style="text-align:left;" | Todd White (Incumbent)
| style="text-align:right;" |3,608
| style="text-align:right;" |75.64%
| style="text-align:right;" |+26.28%
| style="text-align:right;" |$4,978.32
|-
| style="background:#0047ab;"|
| style="text-align:left;" | Cahl Brown
| style="text-align:right;" |1,162
| style="text-align:right;" |24.36%
| style="text-align:right;" |-
| style="text-align:right;" |n/a1
|-  style="text-align:right; background:#fff;"
| colspan="2"|Total Votes
||4,770
||18.39%
| style="text-align:right; background:#fff;"|
| style="text-align:right; background:#fff;"|
|-  style="text-align:right; background:#fff;"
| colspan="2"|Registered Voters
||25,929
| style="text-align:right; background:#fff;"|
| style="text-align:right; background:#fff;"|
| style="text-align:right; background:#fff;"|
|- 
| style="text-align:left;" colspan="6" |1 These candidates did not submit official Financial Statements and are, therefore, ineligible to run in the  2018 Municipal election Note: All Hamilton Municipal Elections are officially non-partisan.  Note: Candidate campaign colours are based on the prominent colour used in campaign items (signs, literature, etc.)and are used as a visual differentiation between candidates.
|- 
| style="text-align:left;" colspan="13" |Sources: City of Hamilton, "Nominated Candidates" 
|}

Ward Six (East Mountain)
In late 2013, incumbent trustee Laura Peddle announced she would not be seeking re-election. Allan Miles, a youth worker living in Stoney Creek, was the first candidate to register on January 21. Speaking with the Mountain News in February, Miles said he was running to "be transparent with the parents and voters."

In April, Eamon O'Donnell, a licensed air conditioning technician and Highview Elementary School parent registered to run in the ward. Speaking with the Mountain News after his nomination, O'Donnell questioned the figures board staff had presented when discussing the needed repairs at Sherwood Secondary School and said that, as a trustee, he "would ask a lot more questions with regard to how the money's being spent."

|-
!rowspan="2" colspan="2"|Candidate
!colspan="3"|Popular vote
!rowspan="2" colspan="2"|Expenditures
|-
! Votes
! %
! ±%
|-
| style="background:#663854;"|
| style="text-align:left;" | Kathy Archer
| style="text-align:right;" |2,094
| style="text-align:right;" |33.37%
| style="text-align:right;" |-3.67%
| style="text-align:right;" |$1,107.34
|-
| style="background:#2e144a;"|
| style="text-align:left;" | Allan Miles
| style="text-align:right;" |1,632	
| style="text-align:right;" |26.01%
| style="text-align:right;" | – 
| style="text-align:right;" |$6,125.38
|-
| style="background:#99badd;"|
| style="text-align:left;" | Eamon O'Donnell
| style="text-align:right;" |1,542
| style="text-align:right;" |24.57%
| style="text-align:right;" | –
| style="text-align:right;" |$2,576.65
|-
| style="background:#fff;"|
| style="text-align:left;" | Angie Armstrong
| style="text-align:right;" |636	
| style="text-align:right;" |10.14%
| style="text-align:right;" | –
| style="text-align:right;" |$389.13
|-
| style="background:#b57edc;"|
| style="text-align:left;" | Tanya Prosser
| style="text-align:right;" |371
| style="text-align:right;" |5.91%
| style="text-align:right;" | –
| style="text-align:right;" |n/a1
|-  style="text-align:right; background:#fff;"
| colspan="2"|Total Votes
||6,275
||22.32%
| style="text-align:right; background:#fff;"|
| style="text-align:right; background:#fff;"|
|-  style="text-align:right; background:#fff;"
| colspan="2"|Registered Voters
||28,114
| style="text-align:right; background:#fff;"|
| style="text-align:right; background:#fff;"|
| style="text-align:right; background:#fff;"|
|- 
| style="text-align:left;" colspan="6" |1 These candidates did not submit official Financial Statements and are, therefore, ineligible to run in the  2018 Municipal election Note: All Hamilton Municipal Elections are officially non-partisan.  Note: Candidate campaign colours are based on the prominent colour used in campaign items (signs, literature, etc.)and are used as a visual differentiation between candidates.
|- 
| style="text-align:left;" colspan="13" |Sources: City of Hamilton, "Nominated Candidates" 
|}

Ward Seven (Central Mountain)

Marlon Picken, an environmental aide at the Juravinski Hospital and runner up in the 2010 race, filed to run again on January 20. Speaking with The Hamilton Mountain News, Picken noted that he hopes to oppose school closures and work on building a consensus among trustees on the best way to save community schools. The next entrant into the race was Michael Patchett, a 35-year-old carpenter, indicated that he wanted to minimize bussing and keep schools open. Patchett withdrew on September 5. Sarah Warry-Poljanski was the third candidate to register, opposing the school closures in her community, telling the Mountain News, "her involvement in the closure study that could shutter up to three central Mountain elementary schools piqued her interest in taking the political plunge." Sarah also stated that she hopes to utilize her skills and knowledge from working with children and youth to bring something new to the table. Dawn Danko, a Medical Radiation Sciences professor who was involved in the accommodation review at her children's school, registered in the summer of 2014.

|-
!rowspan="2" colspan="2"|Candidate
!colspan="3"|Popular vote
!rowspan="2" colspan="2"|Expenditures
|-
! Votes
! %
! ±%
|-
| style="background:#fecb45;"|
| style="text-align:left;" |  Dawn Danko
| style="text-align:right;" |5,593	
| style="text-align:right;" |66.42%
| style="text-align:right;" | –
| style="text-align:right;" |$9,556.98
|-
| style="background:#ff7e00;"|
| style="text-align:left;" |  Marlon Picken
| style="text-align:right;" |1,443
| style="text-align:right;" |17.14%
| style="text-align:right;" | -22.09%
| style="text-align:right;" |$9,067.02
|-
| style="background:#96f;"|
| style="text-align:left;" |  Sarah Warry-Poljanski
| style="text-align:right;" |1,385	
| style="text-align:right;" |16.45%
| style="text-align:right;" | –
| style="text-align:right;" |$1,299.46
|-  style="text-align:right; background:#fff;"
| colspan="2"|Total Votes
||8,421
||20.46%
| style="text-align:right; background:#fff;"|
| style="text-align:right; background:#fff;"|
|-  style="text-align:right; background:#fff;"
| colspan="2"|Registered Voters
||41,156
| style="text-align:right; background:#fff;"|
| style="text-align:right; background:#fff;"|
| style="text-align:right; background:#fff;"|
|- 
| style="text-align:left;" colspan="6" |1 These candidates did not submit official Financial Statements and are, therefore, ineligible to run in the  2018 Municipal electionNote: All Hamilton Municipal Elections are officially non-partisan.  Note: Candidate campaign colours are based on the prominent colour used in campaign items (signs, literature, etc.)and are used as a visual differentiation between candidates.
|- 
| style="text-align:left;" colspan="13" |Sources: Hamilton, Ontario City Clerk's Office 
|}

Ward Eight (West Mountain)

Sitting trustee Wes Hicks told the Hamilton Community News that he intended to stand for another term in 2014. Hicks filed on January 20, 2014.

|-
!rowspan="2" colspan="2"|Candidate
!colspan="3"|Popular vote
!rowspan="2" colspan="2"|Expenditures
|-
! Votes
! %
! ±%
|-
| style="background:#ffa700;"|
| style="text-align:left;" | Wes Hicks (incumbent)
| style="text-align:right;" |5,503
| style="text-align:right;" |72.83%
| style="text-align:right;" |+9.45%
| style="text-align:right;" |$4,860.27
|-
| style="background:#d28f71;"|
| style="text-align:left;" | Chris Litfin
| style="text-align:right;" |2,053
| style="text-align:right;" |27.17%
| style="text-align:right;" |-
| style="text-align:right;" |$495.13
|-  style="text-align:right; background:#fff;"
| colspan="2"|Total votes
||7,556
||-
||-
| style="text-align:right; background:#fff;"|
|-  style="text-align:right; background:#fff;"
| colspan="2"|Registered voters
||-
||-
||-
| style="text-align:right; background:#fff;"|
|- 
| style="text-align:left;" colspan="6" |Note: All Hamilton Municipal Elections are officially non-partisan.  Note: Candidate campaign colours are based on the prominent colour used in campaign items (signs, literature, etc.)and are used as a visual differentiation between candidates.
|- 
| style="text-align:left;" colspan="13" |Sources: Hamilton, Ontario, City Clerk's Office 
|}

Wards Nine and Ten (West Stoney Creek)

The Wards Nine and Ten trustee election was marked by the appointment of former Wards Eleven and Twelve trustee Shirley Glauser in 2013 after the sudden death of Bob Barlow. Barlow had been the area's trustee from 2000 to 2003 and again from 2006 until his death at the age of 47. After her appointment, Glauser confirmed that she would not seek a full term as the Stoney Creek trustee, opting to retire from the Board.

The first candidate to register was Ken Chartrand, who was previously a candidate for Ward Eleven councillor in 2010. After Chartrand filed to run in Wards Nine and Ten in February 2014, he withdrew from the race on April 17.

The second candidate to register was Greg Sinasac, a local contractor. In an early interview, Sinasac indicated his priorities were addressing school closures, respecting families, and providing stronger programming for students.

|-
!rowspan="2" colspan="2"|Candidate
!colspan="3"|Popular vote
!rowspan="2" colspan="2"|Expenditures
|-
! Votes
! %
! ±%
|-
| style="background:#9acc62;"|
| style="text-align:left;" |  Jeff Beattie
| style="text-align:right;" |3,260
| style="text-align:right;" |44.35%
| style="text-align:right;" |-
| style="text-align:right;" |$6,310.20
|-
| style="background:#e40012;"|
| style="text-align:left;" |  Stefanie Sheils
| style="text-align:right;" |2,196
| style="text-align:right;" |29.87%
| style="text-align:right;" |-
| style="text-align:right;" |$6,523.72
|-
| style="background:#2a1a6c;"|
| style="text-align:left;" |  Greg Sinasac
| style="text-align:right;" |1,895
| style="text-align:right;" |25.78%
| style="text-align:right;" |-
| style="text-align:right;" |n/a1
|-  style="text-align:right; background:#fff;"
| colspan="2"|Total votes
||7,351
||-
||-
||-
|-  style="text-align:right; background:#fff;"
| colspan="2"|Registered voters
||-
||-
||-
||-
|- 
| style="text-align:left;" colspan="6" |1 These candidates did not submit official Financial Statements and are, therefore, ineligible to run in the  2018 Municipal election Note: All Hamilton Municipal Elections are officially non-partisan.  Note: Candidate campaign colours are based on the prominent colour used in campaign items (signs, literature, etc.)and are used as a visual differentiation between candidates.
|- 
| style="text-align:left;" colspan="13" |Sources: Hamilton, Ontario, City Clerk's Office 
|}

Wards Eleven and Twelve (East Stoney Creek, Ancaster, Glanbrook)

|-
!rowspan="2" colspan="2"|Candidate
!colspan="3"|Popular vote
!rowspan="2" colspan="2"|Expenditures
|-
! Votes
! %
! ±%
|-
| style="background:#ffaf00;"|
| style="text-align:left;" | Alex Johnstone (Incumbent)
| style="text-align:right;" |5,190
| style="text-align:right;" |42.38%
| style="text-align:right;" |-24.52%
| style="text-align:right;" |$3,477.63
|-
| style="background:#dd0048;"|
| style="text-align:left;" | Serena Samuel
| style="text-align:right;" |3,986
| style="text-align:right;" |32.55%
| style="text-align:right;" |n/a
| style="text-align:right;" | n/a1
|-
| style="background:#5ecdfb;"|
| style="text-align:left;" | Mike Bell
| style="text-align:right;" |3,070
| style="text-align:right;" |25.07%
| style="text-align:right;" |n/a
| style="text-align:right;" |$2,901.48
|-  style="text-align:right; background:#fff;"
| colspan="2"|Total Votes
||12,246
| style="text-align:right; background:#fff;"|
| style="text-align:right; background:#fff;"|
| style="text-align:right; background:#fff;"|
|-  style="text-align:right; background:#fff;"
| colspan="2"|Registered Voters
| style="text-align:right; background:#fff;"|
| style="text-align:right; background:#fff;"|
| style="text-align:right; background:#fff;"|
| style="text-align:right; background:#fff;"|
|- 
| style="text-align:left;" colspan="6" |1 These candidates did not submit official Financial Statements and are, therefore, ineligible to run in the  2018 Municipal election Note: All Hamilton Municipal Elections are officially non-partisan.  Note: Candidate campaign colours are based on the prominent colour used in campaign items (signs, literature, etc.)and are used as a visual differentiation between candidates.
|- 
| style="text-align:left;" colspan="13" |Sources: City of Hamilton, "Nominated Candidates" 
|}

Ward Thirteen (Dundas)

Ancaster resident and former Family Coalition Party candidate Bob Maton was the first candidate to register in Wards Thirteen and Fourteen on January 24. Speaking to Hamilton Community News in February, Maton listed his priorities as investigating "single-gender classes, offering more specialty programs in the arts and construction, and welcoming 'a lot more corporate sponsorship of programs'." Copetown resident Christopher Yendt was the last person to register, on September 10.  Yendt stressed his "youth and vitality, compared to the other candidates" and wanted to focus on changing "the co-op program to allow students to see real, on-the-ground applications of trades earlier in their programs."

|-
!rowspan="2" colspan="2"|Candidate
!colspan="3"|Popular vote
!rowspan="2" colspan="2"|Expenditures
|-
! Votes
! %
! ±%
|-
| style="background:#1665ac;"|
| style="text-align:left;" | Greg Van Geffen
| style="text-align:right;" | 5,166
| style="text-align:right;" | 54.32%
| style="text-align:right;" | –
| style="text-align:right;" |$6,808.67
|-
| style="background:#ffa5ff;"|
| style="text-align:left;" | Bob Maton
| style="text-align:right;" | 2,644
| style="text-align:right;" | 38.31%
| style="text-align:right;" | –
| style="text-align:right;" |$5,573.88
|-
| style="background:#b31217;"|
| style="text-align:left;" | Christopher Yendt
| style="text-align:right;" | 701
| style="text-align:right;" | 7.37%
| style="text-align:right;" | –
| style="text-align:right;" |n/a1
|-  style="text-align:right; background:#fff;"
| colspan="2"|Total Votes
|| 12,377
|| 39.69%
|| −6.11%
|| 
|-  style="text-align:right; background:#fff;"
| colspan="2"|Registered Voters
|| 31,188
|| 
|| 
|| 
|- 
| style="text-align:left;" colspan="6" |1 These candidates did not submit official Financial Statements and are, therefore, ineligible to run in the  2018 Municipal election  Note: All Hamilton Municipal Elections are officially non-partisan.  Note: Candidate campaign colours are based on the prominent colour used in campaign items (signs, literature, etc.)and are used as a visual differentiation between candidates.
|- 
| style="text-align:left;" colspan="13" |Sources: City of Hamilton, "Nominated Candidates" 
|}

Wards Fourteen and Fifteen (Wentworth - Flamborough)

|-
!rowspan="2" colspan="2"|Candidate
!colspan="3"|Popular vote
!rowspan="2" colspan="2"|Expenditures
|-
! Votes
! %
! ±%
|-
| style="background:#f26a81;"|
| style="text-align:left;" | Penny Deathe
| style="text-align:right;" |2,137
| style="text-align:right;" |50.13
| style="text-align:right;" |-
| style="text-align:right;" |$3,646.92
|-
| style="background:#3611db;"|
| style="text-align:left;" | Nick Lauwers
| style="text-align:right;" |2,126
| style="text-align:right;" |49.87
| style="text-align:right;" |-
| style="text-align:right;" |$11,269.49
|-  style="text-align:right; background:#fff;"
| colspan="2"|Total Votes
||4,263
| style="text-align:right; background:#fff;"|
| style="text-align:right; background:#fff;"|
| style="text-align:right; background:#fff;"|
|-  style="text-align:right; background:#fff;"
| colspan="2"|Registered Voters
| style="text-align:right; background:#fff;"|
| style="text-align:right; background:#fff;"|
| style="text-align:right; background:#fff;"|
| style="text-align:right; background:#fff;"|
|- 
| style="text-align:left;" colspan="6" |Note: All Hamilton Municipal Elections are officially non-partisan.  Note: Candidate campaign colours are based on the prominent colour used in campaign items (signs, literature, etc.)and are used as a visual differentiation between candidates.
|- 
| style="text-align:left;" colspan="13" |Sources: City of Hamilton, "Nominated Candidates" 
|}

Catholic School Board Trustee Elections

Wards One and Two

|-
!rowspan="2" colspan="2"|Candidate
!colspan="3"|Popular vote
!rowspan="2" colspan="2"|Expenditures
|-
! Votes
! %
! ±%
|-
| style="background:#4f7942;"|
| style="text-align:left;" | Mark Valvasori (Incumbent)
| style="text-align:right;" |1,774
| style="text-align:right;" |82.86%
| style="text-align:right;" |+39.47%
| style="text-align:right;" |$729.39
|-
| style="background:#fff;"|
| style="text-align:left;" | Al Ptasinkskas
| style="text-align:right;" |367
| style="text-align:right;" |17.14%
| style="text-align:right;" |-
| style="text-align:right;" |n/a1
|-  style="text-align:right; background:#fff;"
| colspan="2"|Total Votes
||2,141
| style="text-align:right; background:#fff;"|
| style="text-align:right; background:#fff;"|
| style="text-align:right; background:#fff;"|
|-  style="text-align:right; background:#fff;"
| colspan="2"|Registered Voters
| style="text-align:right; background:#fff;"|
| style="text-align:right; background:#fff;"|
| style="text-align:right; background:#fff;"|
| style="text-align:right; background:#fff;"|
|- 
| style="text-align:left;" colspan="6" |1 These candidates did not submit official Financial Statements and are, therefore, ineligible to run in the  2018 Municipal election Note: All Hamilton Municipal Elections are officially non-partisan.  Note: Candidate campaign colours are based on the prominent colour used in campaign items (signs, literature, etc.)and are used as a visual differentiation between candidates.
|- 
| style="text-align:left;" colspan="13" |Sources: City of Hamilton, "Nominated Candidates" 
|}

Wards Three and Four

|-
!rowspan="2" colspan="2"|Candidate
!colspan="3"|Popular vote
!rowspan="2" colspan="2"|Expenditures
|-
! Votes
! %
! ±%
|-
| style="background:#f00;"|
| style="text-align:left;" | Anthony Perri
| style="text-align:right;" |1,307
| style="text-align:right;" |41.28%
| style="text-align:right;" |
| style="text-align:right;" |$8,384.02
|-
| style="background:#6ec7c0;"|
| style="text-align:left;" | Frank Ciotti
| style="text-align:right;" |616
| style="text-align:right;" |19.46%
| style="text-align:right;" |
| style="text-align:right;" |n/a1
|-
| style="background:#f65a4b;"|
| style="text-align:left;" | Louis Agro
| style="text-align:right;" |409
| style="text-align:right;" |12.92%
| style="text-align:right;" |
| style="text-align:right;" |$267
|-
| style="background:#00bfff;"|
| style="text-align:left;" | Brian Nestor
| style="text-align:right;" |365
| style="text-align:right;" |11.53%
| style="text-align:right;" |
| style="text-align:right;" |$0
|-
| style="background:#905da6;"|
| style="text-align:left;" | Anthony Mamone
| style="text-align:right;" |340
| style="text-align:right;" |10.74%
| style="text-align:right;" |
| style="text-align:right;" |n/a1
|-
| style="background:#a3432e;"|
| style="text-align:left;" | George Harbottle
| style="text-align:right;" |129
| style="text-align:right;" |4.07%
| style="text-align:right;" |
| style="text-align:right;" |n/a1
|-  style="text-align:right; background:#fff;"
| colspan="2"|Total Votes
||3,166
||100%
| style="text-align:right; background:#fff;"|
| style="text-align:right; background:#fff;"|
|-  style="text-align:right; background:#fff;"
| colspan="2"|Registered Voters
| style="text-align:right; background:#fff;"|
| style="text-align:right; background:#fff;"|
| style="text-align:right; background:#fff;"|
| style="text-align:right; background:#fff;"|
|- 
| style="text-align:left;" colspan="6" |1 These candidates did not submit official Financial Statements and are, therefore, ineligible to run in the  2018 Municipal election Note: All Hamilton Municipal Elections are officially non-partisan.  Note: Candidate campaign colours are based on the prominent colour used in campaign items (signs, literature, etc.)and are used as a visual differentiation between candidates.
|- 
| style="text-align:left;" colspan="13" |Sources: City of Hamilton, "Nominated Candidates" 
|}

Ward Five

|-
!rowspan="2" colspan="2"|Candidate
!colspan="3"|Popular vote
!rowspan="2" colspan="2"|Expenditures
|-
! Votes
! %
! ±%
|-
| style="background:#42a7f4;"|
| style="text-align:left;" | Aldo D'Intino
| style="text-align:right;" |1,544
| style="text-align:right;" |48.69
| style="text-align:right;" |n/a
| style="text-align:right;" |$1,193.55
|-
| style="background:#f00;"|
| style="text-align:left;" | Sam Agostino (Incumbent)
| style="text-align:right;" |1,235
| style="text-align:right;" |38.95
| style="text-align:right;" |-1.99
| style="text-align:right;" |$100.00
|-
| style="background:#7fe095;"|
| style="text-align:left;" | Diane Bubanko
| style="text-align:right;" |392
| style="text-align:right;" |12.36
| style="text-align:right;" |n/a
| style="text-align:right;" |$425.73
|-  style="text-align:right; background:#fff;"
| colspan="2"|Total Votes
||3,171
| style="text-align:right; background:#fff;"|
| style="text-align:right; background:#fff;"|
| style="text-align:right; background:#fff;"|
|-  style="text-align:right; background:#fff;"
| colspan="2"|Registered Voters
| style="text-align:right; background:#fff;"|
| style="text-align:right; background:#fff;"|
| style="text-align:right; background:#fff;"|
| style="text-align:right; background:#fff;"|
|- 
| style="text-align:left;" colspan="6" |Note: All Hamilton Municipal Elections are officially non-partisan.  Note: Candidate campaign colours are based on the prominent colour used in campaign items (signs, literature, etc.)and are used as a visual differentiation between candidates.
|- 
| style="text-align:left;" colspan="13" |Sources: City of Hamilton, "Nominated Candidates" 
|}

Ward Six

|-
!rowspan="2" colspan="2"|Candidate
!colspan="3"|Popular vote
!rowspan="2" colspan="2"|Expenditures
|-
! Votes
! %
! ±%
|-
| style="background:#41f4f4;"|
| style="text-align:left;" | Joseph Baiardo
| style="text-align:right;" |1,794
| style="text-align:right;" |63.39
| style="text-align:right;" |n/a
| style="text-align:right;" |$6,188.05
|-
| style="background:#9b0375;"|
| style="text-align:left;" | Ed Pecyna
| style="text-align:right;" |1,036
| style="text-align:right;" |36.61
| style="text-align:right;" |n/a
| style="text-align:right;" |$1,189.76
|-  style="text-align:right; background:#fff;"
| colspan="2"|Total Votes
||2,830
| style="text-align:right; background:#fff;"|
| style="text-align:right; background:#fff;"|
| style="text-align:right; background:#fff;"|
|-  style="text-align:right; background:#fff;"
| colspan="2"|Registered Voters
| style="text-align:right; background:#fff;"|
| style="text-align:right; background:#fff;"|
| style="text-align:right; background:#fff;"|
| style="text-align:right; background:#fff;"|
|- 
| style="text-align:left;" colspan="6" |Note: All Hamilton Municipal Elections are officially non-partisan.  Note: Candidate campaign colours are based on the prominent colour used in campaign items (signs, literature, etc.)and are used as a visual differentiation between candidates.
|- 
| style="text-align:left;" colspan="13" |Sources: City of Hamilton, "Nominated Candidates" 
|}

Ward Seven

|-
!rowspan="2" colspan="2"|Candidate
!colspan="3"|Popular vote
|-
! Votes
! %
! ±%
|-
| style="background:#f00;"|
| style="text-align:left;" | Pat Daly  (Incumbent) 
!colspan="3" style="text-align:center;" | Acclaimed
|-  style="text-align:right; background:#fff;"
| colspan="2"|Total Votes
| style="text-align:right; background:#fff;"|
| style="text-align:right; background:#fff;"|
| style="text-align:right; background:#fff;"|
|-  style="text-align:right; background:#fff;"
| colspan="2"|Registered Voters
| style="text-align:right; background:#fff;"|
| style="text-align:right; background:#fff;"|
| style="text-align:right; background:#fff;"|
|- 
| style="text-align:left;" colspan="6" |Note: All Hamilton Municipal Elections are officially non-partisan.  Note: Candidate campaign colours are based on the prominent colour used in campaign items (signs, literature, etc.)and are used as a visual differentiation between candidates.
|- 
| style="text-align:left;" colspan="13" |Sources: City of Hamilton, "Nominated Candidates" 
|}

Ward Eight

|-
!rowspan="2" colspan="2"|Candidate
!colspan="3"|Popular vote
!rowspan="2" colspan="2"|Expenditures
|-
! Votes
! %
! ±%
|-
| style="background:#4f7942;"|
| style="text-align:left;" | John Valvasori (Incumbent)
| style="text-align:right;" |2,875
| style="text-align:right;" |69.58
| style="text-align:right;" |+24.93
| style="text-align:right;" |$1,420.89
|-
| style="background:#f00;"|
| style="text-align:left;" | Sergio Manchia
| style="text-align:right;" |849
| style="text-align:right;" |20.55
| style="text-align:right;" |-14.2
| style="text-align:right;" |n/a1
|-
| style="background:#450cd3;"|
| style="text-align:left;" | Tad Brudzinski
| style="text-align:right;" |408
| style="text-align:right;" |9.87
| style="text-align:right;" |n/a
| style="text-align:right;" |n/a1
|-  style="text-align:right; background:#fff;"
| colspan="2"|Total Votes
||4,132
| style="text-align:right; background:#fff;"|
| style="text-align:right; background:#fff;"|
| style="text-align:right; background:#fff;"|
|-  style="text-align:right; background:#fff;"
| colspan="2"|Registered Voters
| style="text-align:right; background:#fff;"|
| style="text-align:right; background:#fff;"|
| style="text-align:right; background:#fff;"|
| style="text-align:right; background:#fff;"|
|- 
| style="text-align:left;" colspan="6" |1 These candidates did not submit official Financial Statements and are, therefore, ineligible to run in the  2018 Municipal election Note: All Hamilton Municipal Elections are officially non-partisan.  Note: Candidate campaign colours are based on the prominent colour used in campaign items (signs, literature, etc.)and are used as a visual differentiation between candidates.
|- 
| style="text-align:left;" colspan="13" |Sources: City of Hamilton, "Nominated Candidates" 
|}

Wards Nine, Ten, and Eleven

|-
!rowspan="2" colspan="2"|Candidate
!colspan="3"|Popular vote
!rowspan="2" colspan="2"|Expenditures
|-
! Votes
! %
! ±%
|-
| style="background:#4f7942;"|
| style="text-align:left;" | Paul Di Francesco (incumbent)
| style="text-align:right;" |5,540
| style="text-align:right;" |43.97
| style="text-align:right;" |+17.1
| style="text-align:right;" |$1,823.18
|-
| style="background:#f00;"|
| style="text-align:left;" | Mary Nardini (incumbent)
| style="text-align:right;" |5,451
| style="text-align:right;" |43.26
| style="text-align:right;" |+13.18
| style="text-align:right;" |$1,290.00
|-
| style="background:#6fedf2;"|
| style="text-align:left;" | Bernard Josipovic
| style="text-align:right;" |1,610
| style="text-align:right;" |12.78
| style="text-align:right;" |n/a
| style="text-align:right;" |n/a1
|-  style="text-align:right; background:#fff;"
| colspan="2"|Total Votes
||12,601
| style="text-align:right; background:#fff;"|
| style="text-align:right; background:#fff;"|
| style="text-align:right; background:#fff;"|
|-  style="text-align:right; background:#fff;"
| colspan="2"|Registered Voters
| style="text-align:right; background:#fff;"|
| style="text-align:right; background:#fff;"|
| style="text-align:right; background:#fff;"|
| style="text-align:right; background:#fff;"|
|- 
| style="text-align:left;" colspan="6" |1 These candidates did not submit official Financial Statements and are, therefore, ineligible to run in the  2018 Municipal election Note: This ward elected two Catholic trustees and percentages are specific to each candidate, not for the overall total.Note: All Hamilton Municipal Elections are officially non-partisan.  Note: Candidate campaign colours are based on the prominent colour used in campaign items (signs, literature, etc.)and are used as a visual differentiation between candidates.
|- 
| style="text-align:left;" colspan="13" |Sources: City of Hamilton, "Nominated Candidates" 
|}

Wards Twelve, Thirteen, Fourteen, and Fifteen

|-
!rowspan="2" colspan="2"|Candidate
!colspan="3"|Popular vote
|-
! Votes
! %
! ±%
|-
| style="background:#f00;"|
| style="text-align:left;" | Carolyn Cornale (incumbent)
!colspan="3" style="text-align:center;" | Acclaimed
|-  style="text-align:right; background:#fff;"
| colspan="2"|Total Votes
| style="text-align:right; background:#fff;"|
| style="text-align:right; background:#fff;"|
| style="text-align:right; background:#fff;"|
|-  style="text-align:right; background:#fff;"
| colspan="2"|Registered Voters
| style="text-align:right; background:#fff;"|
| style="text-align:right; background:#fff;"|
| style="text-align:right; background:#fff;"|
|- 
| style="text-align:left;" colspan="6" |Note: All Hamilton Municipal Elections are officially non-partisan.  Note: Candidate campaign colours are based on the prominent colour used in campaign items (signs, literature, etc.)and are used as a visual differentiation between candidates.
|- 
| style="text-align:left;" colspan="13" |Sources: Hamilton, Ontario City Clerk's Office 
|}

French Public School Board election

|-
!rowspan="2" colspan="2"|Candidate
!colspan="3"|Popular vote
|-
! Votes
! %
! ±%
|-
| style="background:#d8ffdd;"|
| style="text-align:left;" | Pierre Girouard
| style="text-align:right;" |165
| style="text-align:right;" |63.22
| style="text-align:right;" |
|-
| style="background:#a3d8ff;"|
| style="text-align:left;" | Malika Attou
| style="text-align:right;" |96
| style="text-align:right;" |36.78
| style="text-align:right;" |
|-  style="text-align:right; background:#fff;"
| colspan="2"|Total Votes
||261
| style="text-align:right; background:#fff;"|
| style="text-align:right; background:#fff;"|
|-  style="text-align:right; background:#fff;"
| colspan="2"|Registered Voters
| style="text-align:right; background:#fff;"|
| style="text-align:right; background:#fff;"|
| style="text-align:right; background:#fff;"|
|- 
| style="text-align:left;" colspan="6" |Note: All Hamilton Municipal Elections are officially non-partisan.  Note: Candidate campaign colours are based on the prominent colour used in campaign items (signs, literature, etc.)and are used as a visual differentiation between candidates.
|- 
| style="text-align:left;" colspan="13" |Sources: Hamilton, Ontario City Clerk's Office 
|}

Micheline Wylde is the incumbent trustee.

French Catholic School Board election

|-
!rowspan="2" colspan="2"|Candidate
!colspan="3"|Popular vote
|-
! Votes
! %
! ±%
|-
| style="background:#7fbee0;"|
| style="text-align:left;" | Marcel Levesque (Incumbent)
| style="text-align:right;" |612
| style="text-align:right;" |80.2
| style="text-align:right;" |
|-
| style="background:#e07fad;"|
| style="text-align:left;" | Mulomba Samuel Kalonji
| style="text-align:right;" |151
| style="text-align:right;" |19.8
| style="text-align:right;" |
|-  style="text-align:right; background:#fff;"
| colspan="2"|Total Votes
||763
| style="text-align:right; background:#fff;"|
| style="text-align:right; background:#fff;"|
|-  style="text-align:right; background:#fff;"
| colspan="2"|Registered Voters
| style="text-align:right; background:#fff;"|
| style="text-align:right; background:#fff;"|
| style="text-align:right; background:#fff;"|
|- 
| style="text-align:left;" colspan="6" |Note: All Hamilton Municipal Elections are officially non-partisan.  Note: Candidate campaign colours are based on the prominent colour used in campaign items (signs, literature, etc.)and are used as a visual differentiation between candidates.
|- 
| style="text-align:left;" colspan="13" |Sources: Hamilton, Ontario City Clerk's Office 
|}

Endorsements

|-
!rowspan="2" colspan="3"|Candidate
! rowspan="2"|Seat Contested
!colspan="2"|Elected
|- 
! Yes
! No
|-
| rowspan="22" style="background:#ffe5b4;"|
| style="background:#008abe;"|
| style="text-align:left;" | Brian McHattie
| style="text-align:right;" | Mayor
| style="background:#fff;"|
| style="background:#f00;"|
|- style="background:#ffe5b4;"
| style="text-align:right;" colspan="2" | Total Endorsed Mayoral Candidates
| 1 || 0 || 1
|-
| style="background:#506621;"|
| style="text-align:left;" | Sandy Shaw
| style="text-align:right;" |Councillor, Ward 1
| style="background:#fff;"|
| style="background:#f00;"|
|-
| style="background:#5f9ea0;"|
| style="text-align:left;" | Jason Farr
| style="text-align:right;" |Councillor, Ward 2
| style="background:#0f0;"|
| style="background:#fff;"|
|-
| style="background:#7bbd55;"|
| style="text-align:left;" | Matthew Green
| style="text-align:right;" |Councillor, Ward 3
| style="background:#0f0;"|
| style="background:#fff;"|
|-
| style="background:#ff7f00;"|
| style="text-align:left;" | Sam Merulla
| style="text-align:right;" |Councillor, Ward 4
| style="background:#0f0;"|
| style="background:#fff;"|
|-
| style="background:#002e63;"|
| style="text-align:left;" | Tom Jackson
| style="text-align:right;" |Councillor, Ward 6
| style="background:#0f0;"|
| style="background:#fff;"|
|-
| style="background:#ff7f00;"|
| style="text-align:left;" | Scott Duvall
| style="text-align:right;" |Councillor, Ward 7
| style="background:#0f0;"|
| style="background:#fff;"|
|-
| style="background:#ff0800;"|
| style="text-align:left;" | Terry Whitehead
| style="text-align:right;" |Councillor, Ward 8
| style="background:#0f0;"|
| style="background:#fff;"|
|-
| style="background:#ff7f00;"|
| style="text-align:left;" | Gerladine McMullen
| style="text-align:right;" |Councillor, Ward 9
| style="background:#fff;"|
| style="background:#f00;"|
|-
| style="background:#ffbf00;"|
| style="text-align:left;" | Robert Pasuta
| style="text-align:right;" |Councillor, Ward 13
| style="background:#0f0;"|
| style="background:#fff;"|
|- style="background:#ffe5b4;"
| style="text-align:right;" colspan="2" | Total Endorsed Council Candidates
| 9 || 7 || 2
|-
| style="background:#ffba00;"|
| style="text-align:left;" | Chris Erl
| style="text-align:right;" |Public Trustee, Wards 1 & 2
| style="background:#fff;"|
| style="background:#f00;"|
|-
| style="background:#fefe06;"|
| style="text-align:left;" | Larry Pattison
| style="text-align:right;" |Public Trustee, Ward 3
| style="background:#0f0;"|
| style="background:#fff;"|
|-
| style="background:#8db600;"|
| style="text-align:left;" | Ray Mulholland
| style="text-align:right;" |Public Trustee, Ward 4
| style="background:#0f0;"|
| style="background:#fff;"|
|-
| style="background:#ff7e00;"|
| style="text-align:left;" | Todd White 
| style="text-align:right;" |Public Trustee, Ward 5
| style="background:#0f0;"|
| style="background:#fff;"|
|-
| style="background:#ff7e00;"|
| style="text-align:left;" | Marlon Picken 
| style="text-align:right;" |Public Trustee, Ward 7
| style="background:#fff;"|
| style="background:#f00;"|
|-
| style="background:#ffa700;"|
| style="text-align:left;" | Wes Hicks
| style="text-align:right;" |Public Trustee, Ward 8
| style="background:#0f0;"|
| style="background:#fff;"|
|-
| style="background:#2a1a6c;"|
| style="text-align:left;" | Greg Sinasac
| style="text-align:right;" |Public Trustee, Wards 9 & 10
| style="background:#fff;"|
| style="background:#f00;"|
|-
| style="background:#ff7f00;"|
| style="text-align:left;" | Alex Johnstone
| style="text-align:right;" |Public Trustee, Wards 11 & 12
| style="background:#0f0;"|
| style="background:#fff;"|
|-
| style="background:#f26a81;"|
| style="text-align:left;" | Penny Deathe
| style="text-align:right;" |Public Trustee, Wards 15
| style="background:#0f0;"|
| style="background:#fff;"|
|- style="background:#ffe5b4;"
| style="text-align:right;" colspan="2" | Total Endorsed Public Trustee Candidates
| 9 || 6 || 3
|- style="background:#e9e9e9;"
| style="text-align:right;" colspan="3" | Total Endorsed Candidates
| 19 || 13 || 6
|- 
| style="text-align:left;" colspan="13" |Sources: "McHattie gets labour council backing", Hamilton Spectator, Wednesday, August 20, 2014, pp. A19.
|}

Incumbents not seeking re-election

Bob Bratina announced in March 2014 he would not seek another term as mayor
Ward Three HWDSB trustee Tim Simmons declined to seek re-election, opting to vie for the position of Ward Three councillor.
Laura Peddle, HWDSB trustee for Ward Six, told the Hamilton Mountain News that she would not be seeking re-election. Having attended meetings electronically in November and December 2013, Peddle indicated that her decision was due to a "romantic change in her life."
Shirley Glauser, who was appointed to represent Wards Nine and Ten on the HWDSB in the summer of 2013, announced she would not contest the seat in 2014.
Karen Turkstra, HWDSB trustee for Wards Fourteen and Fifteen, announced she would be retiring after two terms on the board, saying she wanted to spend more time with her family and felt it was inappropriate to serve on the board after her children had graduated from HWDSB schools years prior.

Withdrawn candidates

Brett Tillotson, candidate for Ward Nine councillor, withdrew on March 7. Tillotson made his intention to withdraw known to Hamilton Community News in February.
Brad Olynchuk, candidate for council in Ward Six, withdrew from the race on March 24.
Grant Thomas, Wards One and Two Public School Board Trustee candidate, withdrew on March 28.
Ivana Nosic, Ward Two council candidate, withdrew on April 10.

Mid-term elections

Catholic Trustee, Ward 6

In April 2012, Catholic Trustee for Ward 6 (East Mountain), Father Kyran Kennedy, resigned for medical reasons. Sitting members voted to hold a special election, rather than a by-election because of the costs associated with holding a ward-wide poll. Candidates included former trustees Raymond Bartolotti and John Rocchi, 2010 Ward Five trustee candidate Frank Ciotti, and Ward 6 council candidate Ed Pecyna.

The appointment was not without controversy, as Michael Ecker, the second-place candidate against Kennedy in 2010, was denied an opportunity to apply for the position after failing to supply financial statements from the October election. Under the Municipal Elections Act, Ecker became ineligible for election until 2018. Ecker challenged the penalty, but the case was dismissed by the Ontario Superior Court of Justice.

Public Trustee, Wards 9 and 10
On May 29, 2013, Public School Board Trustee Robert Barlow died from a heart attack while coaching a baseball game. Members of the Public School Board decided to hold a special election to fill the role of trustee for Wards Nine and Ten (Stoney Creek). The Board made the decision to hold a special meeting at the end of August to decide Barlow's replacement. Candidates included former Wards 11 and 12 trustee Shirley Glauser, former Wards One and Two candidate Edward Cole, 2007 provincial Liberal candidate for Hamilton East-Stoney Creek Nerene Virgin, post-secondary students Chris Erl and Christopher Litfin from McMaster and Awish Aslam from Western University, and local artist Carly McAskill.

After candidates gave 10-minute speeches to the Board, sitting trustees selected a candidate, electing former trustee Shirley Glauser on the third ballot.

Timeline

2010
October 25, 2010: 2010 Hamilton Municipal election
October 26, 2010: In a story about his acclaimation to council, Ward 14 Councillor Robert Pasuta muses about standing for Mayor in 2014.
November 4, 2010:  Bratina chooses Peggy Chapman as his chief of staff. Before beginning work with the mayor's office, Chapman was a journalist with the Bay Observer and Councillor Brad Clark's press-secretary when he was provincial Minister of Labour.
December 29, 2010: Bratina's mayoral win is named the Spectator's story of the year by the paper's editorial board.

2011
January 12, 2011: The stadium debate, cited as one of the reasons for Fred Eisenberger's defeat, is settled, with council deciding to back a plan that would have Ivor Wynne Stadium renovated and the Hamilton Tiger Cats play at the existing stadium site for 20 years.
February 3, 2011: Mayor Bratina's $10,000 donation to the city's United Way campaign comes under scrutiny for possibly violating municipal rules concerning individual donations to charities.
February 7, 2011: Former Mayor Fred Eisenberger takes over as the President of the Canadian Urban Institute.
February 15, 2011: Bratina delivers his first State of the City address.
February 17, 2011: Larry Di Ianni hosts a fundraiser to retire his campaign debt, where he announces his 2010 campaign would be his last.
April 20, 2011: Council approves the lowest property tax increase since amalgamation, at 0.8%.
June 27, 2011: Council dissolves the Hamilton Entertainment and Convention Facilities Inc., or HECFI, Board of Directors and assumes control of the organization, putting the Mayor and councillors in charge following reports that the previous board was dysfunctional and the agency needed nearly $12 million to continue operating for the previous fiscal year.
July 18, 2011: Nicholas Kevlahan, a member of the city's Rapid Transit Advisory Committee, resigns after comments made by City Manager Chris Murray and Mayor Bob Bratina signal that the city will no longer be pursuing light rail transit.
August 5, 2011: After a Twitter dispute between Canadian novelist Margaret Atwood and Toronto City Councillor Doug Ford, the literary figure accepts an offer from Bratina and the Spectator to visit the city, praising the development of the arts community in Hamilton's downtown.
September 14, 2011: Bratina endorses the Liberal Party in the 2011 provincial election. 
October 11, 2011: Council supports a motion by Councilor Terry Whitehead that strips Bratina of the authority to lobby senior levels of government without having other members of council present after endorsing the provincial Liberals.
November 19, 2011: Former Mayor Fred Eisenberger publishes an opinion piece in the Hamilton Spectator responding to Bratina's critiques of his leadership a year following his victory.
December 7, 2011: It is revealed that Bratina's chief of staff, Peggy Chapman, received a $30,000 raise. Mayor Bratina tells the Spectator that city hall's human resources department gave her the raise, making a point of noting "I didn't give a raise, she didn't ask for a raise."
December 8, 2011: The city's Human Resources manager Helen Hale Tomasik circulates an email to councillors saying Bratina triggered his chief of staff's raise, while the mayor denies involvement in the issue.
December 9, 2011: Bratina takes full responsibility for authorizing Chapman's raise. The issue, known colloquially as Peggygate in local media, sparked council to hold in-camera meetings to discuss the issue.
December 30, 2011: Bratina announces he is canceling the Office of the Mayor's traditional New Year's Levee.

2012
January 12, 2012: In an interview with Cable 14 reporter Laura Babcock, former mayor Eisenberger indicates that he misses local politics, but does not make any definitive statements as to his intentions for 2014, saying "We'll see what the next two, three years look like."
March 28, 2012: Bratina becomes the first mayor in Hamilton history to be censured by his peers in a 15–1 vote of council.
April 10, 2012: Following the resignation of Father Kyran Kennedy, Ward Six Catholic Trustee, the Hamilton Wentworth District Catholic School Board appointed Raymond Bartolotti, former Trustee for Wards 9, 10, 11, to the position. Bartolotti was selected by sitting members of the Board.
May 18, 2012: Mayor Bratina, in an interview with CBC Hamilton, declines to confirm if he will seek a second term, but tells reporters he will not "just quietly walk into the sunset" after Peggygate
June 4, 2012: The Hamilton Spectators columnist Andrew Dreschel speculates on candidates who may challenge Bratina in 2014, including Councillors Terry Whitehead, Chad Collins and Lloyd Ferguson, as well as former Liberal MPPs Marie Bountrogianni and Sophia Aggelonitis, while once again raising Trivaris CEO Mark Chamberlain's name as a contender.
June 8, 2012: Bratina is reprimanded a second time over the raise given to his chief of staff, this time by the city's integrity commissioner, Earl Basse.
June 11, 2012: Agriculture Minister and Ancaster—Dundas—Flamborough—Westdale MPP Ted McMeekin speculates about challenging Bratina in 2014.
October 10, 2012: Justin Trudeau, candidate for the Liberal Party leadership, stops in Hamilton. During the visit, Councillor Chad Collins raises speculation that he may stand for the Liberals in the 2015 Federal Election, all while maintaining rumours of his interest in contesting the mayoralty in 2014.

2013
January 25, 2013: McMeekin, in an interview explaining his support for Kathleen Wynne in the Liberal Party of Ontario leadership election, indicated that he anticipated running in the next provincial election, while not discussing any Mayoral ambitions.
February 23, 2013: Mark Coakley, a local parent, candidate for Ward 13 School Board Trustee in 2003, and Green Party of Ontario candidate in the 2000 by-election in Ancaster—Dundas—Flamborough—Aldershot, files an application with the Superior Court of Justice to remove Wards 1&2 Public School Trustee Judy Bishop from office over allegations that Bishop voted to close Prince Philip Elementary in the Ainsley Wood neighbourhood in favour of improving schools in Westdale where she owns property, thus boosting its value. The maximum penalty for doing so is removal from her position and a seven-year ban from holding public office. Days before the announcement, Coakley published a letter to the editor demanding that Bishop "get off the gravy train."
May 29, 2013: Robert Barlow, Public School Board Trustee for Wards 9&10, dies suddenly of a heart attack while coaching a baseball game.
 August 12, 2013: The conflict of interest case against Bishop was settled, allowing the trustee to retain her seat on the Board of Education.

2014
January 2, 2014: Municipal nominations open
May 2, 2014: Following NDP leader Andrea Horwath's announcement that her caucus cannot support the budget of Kathleen Wynne's minority Liberal government, the Premier asks Lieutenant Governor David Onley to dissolve the provincial legislature and call an election for June 12, all of which falls within the campaign period for the October 27 municipal race.

External links
 City of Hamilton official Municipal Elections webpage

Campaign websites

Mayoral
Brad Clark
Fred Eisenberger
Brian McHattie

Ward One Councillor
Jason Allen
Aidan Johnson
Ira Rosen
Sandy Shaw

Ward Three Councillor
Bob Assadourian
Matthew Green
Drina Omazic

Ward Nine Councillor
Marie Robbins

Ward Ten Councillor
Teresa DiFalco

Ward Eleven Councillor
Brenda Johnson

Ward Thirteen Councillor
Danya Scime
Marc Risdale

Ward Fourteen Councillor
Steven Knowles

Wards One and Two Public School Board Trustee
Chris Erl

Ward Three Public School Board Trustee
Larry Thomas Pattison Jr.

Ward Four Public School Board Trustee
Linda Chenoweth

Ward Six Public School Board Trustee
Al Miles

Ward Seven Public School Board Trustee
Dawn Danko

Wards One and Two Catholic School Board Trustee
Mark Valvasori

See also
List of Hamilton, Ontario municipal elections

References 

2014 Ontario municipal elections
2014